

390001–390100 

|-bgcolor=#E9E9E9
| 390001 ||  || — || January 16, 2005 || Socorro || LINEAR || — || align=right | 1.9 km || 
|-id=002 bgcolor=#E9E9E9
| 390002 ||  || — || October 7, 2004 || Kitt Peak || Spacewatch || — || align=right | 1.1 km || 
|-id=003 bgcolor=#d6d6d6
| 390003 ||  || — || May 10, 2005 || Kitt Peak || Spacewatch || — || align=right | 3.1 km || 
|-id=004 bgcolor=#E9E9E9
| 390004 ||  || — || September 26, 1998 || Kitt Peak || Spacewatch || DOR || align=right | 2.8 km || 
|-id=005 bgcolor=#E9E9E9
| 390005 ||  || — || January 22, 1993 || Kitt Peak || Spacewatch || — || align=right | 1.0 km || 
|-id=006 bgcolor=#fefefe
| 390006 ||  || — || August 28, 2005 || Kitt Peak || Spacewatch || V || align=right data-sort-value="0.77" | 770 m || 
|-id=007 bgcolor=#d6d6d6
| 390007 ||  || — || April 16, 2004 || Kitt Peak || Spacewatch || — || align=right | 3.6 km || 
|-id=008 bgcolor=#E9E9E9
| 390008 ||  || — || November 14, 1998 || Kitt Peak || Spacewatch || GEF || align=right | 1.5 km || 
|-id=009 bgcolor=#E9E9E9
| 390009 ||  || — || December 30, 2008 || Catalina || CSS || — || align=right | 2.9 km || 
|-id=010 bgcolor=#E9E9E9
| 390010 ||  || — || August 24, 2007 || Kitt Peak || Spacewatch || — || align=right | 1.9 km || 
|-id=011 bgcolor=#E9E9E9
| 390011 ||  || — || November 20, 2003 || Socorro || LINEAR || — || align=right | 2.9 km || 
|-id=012 bgcolor=#E9E9E9
| 390012 ||  || — || April 19, 2006 || Kitt Peak || Spacewatch || — || align=right | 1.2 km || 
|-id=013 bgcolor=#E9E9E9
| 390013 ||  || — || April 19, 2006 || Kitt Peak || Spacewatch || — || align=right | 1.3 km || 
|-id=014 bgcolor=#d6d6d6
| 390014 ||  || — || March 18, 2009 || Kitt Peak || Spacewatch || — || align=right | 3.3 km || 
|-id=015 bgcolor=#fefefe
| 390015 ||  || — || April 25, 2003 || Kitt Peak || Spacewatch || MAS || align=right data-sort-value="0.93" | 930 m || 
|-id=016 bgcolor=#E9E9E9
| 390016 ||  || — || November 6, 2008 || Catalina || CSS || — || align=right | 1.7 km || 
|-id=017 bgcolor=#E9E9E9
| 390017 ||  || — || March 4, 2005 || Mount Lemmon || Mount Lemmon Survey || AGN || align=right data-sort-value="0.78" | 780 m || 
|-id=018 bgcolor=#d6d6d6
| 390018 ||  || — || October 18, 2007 || Mount Lemmon || Mount Lemmon Survey || KOR || align=right | 1.2 km || 
|-id=019 bgcolor=#fefefe
| 390019 ||  || — || December 5, 2005 || Kitt Peak || Spacewatch || NYS || align=right data-sort-value="0.70" | 700 m || 
|-id=020 bgcolor=#E9E9E9
| 390020 ||  || — || November 7, 2008 || Mount Lemmon || Mount Lemmon Survey || HEN || align=right data-sort-value="0.92" | 920 m || 
|-id=021 bgcolor=#d6d6d6
| 390021 ||  || — || December 3, 2008 || Mount Lemmon || Mount Lemmon Survey || — || align=right | 2.6 km || 
|-id=022 bgcolor=#fefefe
| 390022 ||  || — || January 27, 2007 || Kitt Peak || Spacewatch || — || align=right data-sort-value="0.86" | 860 m || 
|-id=023 bgcolor=#E9E9E9
| 390023 ||  || — || October 20, 2003 || Kitt Peak || Spacewatch || NEM || align=right | 2.3 km || 
|-id=024 bgcolor=#d6d6d6
| 390024 ||  || — || June 27, 2011 || Kitt Peak || Spacewatch || — || align=right | 3.3 km || 
|-id=025 bgcolor=#E9E9E9
| 390025 ||  || — || October 31, 2008 || Catalina || CSS || HNS || align=right | 1.3 km || 
|-id=026 bgcolor=#E9E9E9
| 390026 ||  || — || October 3, 2003 || Kitt Peak || Spacewatch || NEM || align=right | 2.3 km || 
|-id=027 bgcolor=#d6d6d6
| 390027 ||  || — || September 18, 2007 || Mount Lemmon || Mount Lemmon Survey || THM || align=right | 2.1 km || 
|-id=028 bgcolor=#fefefe
| 390028 ||  || — || March 14, 2007 || Kitt Peak || Spacewatch || — || align=right data-sort-value="0.90" | 900 m || 
|-id=029 bgcolor=#E9E9E9
| 390029 ||  || — || November 18, 1995 || Kitt Peak || Spacewatch || — || align=right | 2.0 km || 
|-id=030 bgcolor=#E9E9E9
| 390030 ||  || — || August 24, 2007 || Kitt Peak || Spacewatch || — || align=right | 2.1 km || 
|-id=031 bgcolor=#E9E9E9
| 390031 ||  || — || September 15, 2012 || Kitt Peak || Spacewatch || — || align=right | 2.2 km || 
|-id=032 bgcolor=#fefefe
| 390032 ||  || — || September 22, 2008 || Kitt Peak || Spacewatch || — || align=right | 1.0 km || 
|-id=033 bgcolor=#E9E9E9
| 390033 ||  || — || September 14, 2007 || Catalina || CSS || — || align=right | 2.6 km || 
|-id=034 bgcolor=#E9E9E9
| 390034 ||  || — || November 30, 2008 || Mount Lemmon || Mount Lemmon Survey || — || align=right | 1.1 km || 
|-id=035 bgcolor=#fefefe
| 390035 ||  || — || July 1, 2008 || Kitt Peak || Spacewatch || — || align=right | 1.0 km || 
|-id=036 bgcolor=#d6d6d6
| 390036 ||  || — || October 9, 2007 || Kitt Peak || Spacewatch || — || align=right | 3.6 km || 
|-id=037 bgcolor=#fefefe
| 390037 ||  || — || November 6, 2005 || Kitt Peak || Spacewatch || — || align=right data-sort-value="0.99" | 990 m || 
|-id=038 bgcolor=#E9E9E9
| 390038 ||  || — || January 13, 2005 || Kitt Peak || Spacewatch || NEM || align=right | 2.6 km || 
|-id=039 bgcolor=#d6d6d6
| 390039 ||  || — || November 19, 2001 || Socorro || LINEAR || HYG || align=right | 2.9 km || 
|-id=040 bgcolor=#E9E9E9
| 390040 ||  || — || October 15, 2007 || Mount Lemmon || Mount Lemmon Survey || WIT || align=right | 1.2 km || 
|-id=041 bgcolor=#d6d6d6
| 390041 ||  || — || September 18, 2007 || Mount Lemmon || Mount Lemmon Survey || EMA || align=right | 3.1 km || 
|-id=042 bgcolor=#E9E9E9
| 390042 ||  || — || September 17, 2003 || Kitt Peak || Spacewatch || — || align=right | 1.9 km || 
|-id=043 bgcolor=#E9E9E9
| 390043 ||  || — || June 3, 2011 || Mount Lemmon || Mount Lemmon Survey || WIT || align=right | 1.1 km || 
|-id=044 bgcolor=#d6d6d6
| 390044 ||  || — || November 1, 2007 || Kitt Peak || Spacewatch || — || align=right | 3.2 km || 
|-id=045 bgcolor=#d6d6d6
| 390045 ||  || — || December 22, 2008 || Mount Lemmon || Mount Lemmon Survey || — || align=right | 2.9 km || 
|-id=046 bgcolor=#E9E9E9
| 390046 ||  || — || October 18, 2003 || Anderson Mesa || LONEOS || — || align=right | 3.4 km || 
|-id=047 bgcolor=#E9E9E9
| 390047 ||  || — || October 5, 2000 || Kitt Peak || Spacewatch || EUN || align=right | 1.4 km || 
|-id=048 bgcolor=#fefefe
| 390048 ||  || — || October 30, 2005 || Kitt Peak || Spacewatch || FLO || align=right data-sort-value="0.73" | 730 m || 
|-id=049 bgcolor=#E9E9E9
| 390049 ||  || — || September 16, 2012 || Kitt Peak || Spacewatch || — || align=right | 2.1 km || 
|-id=050 bgcolor=#E9E9E9
| 390050 ||  || — || August 10, 2007 || Kitt Peak || Spacewatch || AST || align=right | 1.3 km || 
|-id=051 bgcolor=#d6d6d6
| 390051 ||  || — || September 15, 2006 || Kitt Peak || Spacewatch || THM || align=right | 2.2 km || 
|-id=052 bgcolor=#fefefe
| 390052 ||  || — || March 26, 2007 || Kitt Peak || Spacewatch || — || align=right data-sort-value="0.76" | 760 m || 
|-id=053 bgcolor=#d6d6d6
| 390053 ||  || — || October 20, 1995 || Kitt Peak || Spacewatch || THM || align=right | 2.2 km || 
|-id=054 bgcolor=#E9E9E9
| 390054 ||  || — || October 17, 2003 || Kitt Peak || Spacewatch || HEN || align=right data-sort-value="0.91" | 910 m || 
|-id=055 bgcolor=#E9E9E9
| 390055 ||  || — || March 8, 2005 || Mount Lemmon || Mount Lemmon Survey || — || align=right | 2.3 km || 
|-id=056 bgcolor=#fefefe
| 390056 ||  || — || September 6, 2008 || Catalina || CSS || V || align=right data-sort-value="0.65" | 650 m || 
|-id=057 bgcolor=#fefefe
| 390057 ||  || — || April 14, 2007 || Kitt Peak || Spacewatch || — || align=right data-sort-value="0.83" | 830 m || 
|-id=058 bgcolor=#E9E9E9
| 390058 ||  || — || December 12, 2004 || Kitt Peak || Spacewatch || — || align=right data-sort-value="0.88" | 880 m || 
|-id=059 bgcolor=#E9E9E9
| 390059 ||  || — || October 12, 1999 || Kitt Peak || Spacewatch || — || align=right | 1.7 km || 
|-id=060 bgcolor=#d6d6d6
| 390060 ||  || — || October 14, 2001 || Kitt Peak || Spacewatch || THM || align=right | 1.9 km || 
|-id=061 bgcolor=#fefefe
| 390061 ||  || — || March 9, 2007 || Kitt Peak || Spacewatch || NYS || align=right data-sort-value="0.78" | 780 m || 
|-id=062 bgcolor=#fefefe
| 390062 ||  || — || November 6, 2005 || Mount Lemmon || Mount Lemmon Survey || — || align=right | 1.0 km || 
|-id=063 bgcolor=#E9E9E9
| 390063 ||  || — || October 1, 2008 || Kitt Peak || Spacewatch || — || align=right data-sort-value="0.98" | 980 m || 
|-id=064 bgcolor=#d6d6d6
| 390064 ||  || — || October 19, 2006 || Catalina || CSS || ALA || align=right | 4.2 km || 
|-id=065 bgcolor=#d6d6d6
| 390065 ||  || — || April 22, 2004 || Kitt Peak || Spacewatch || — || align=right | 3.2 km || 
|-id=066 bgcolor=#fefefe
| 390066 ||  || — || March 17, 2007 || Kitt Peak || Spacewatch || — || align=right data-sort-value="0.83" | 830 m || 
|-id=067 bgcolor=#E9E9E9
| 390067 ||  || — || December 13, 2004 || Kitt Peak || Spacewatch || — || align=right | 2.1 km || 
|-id=068 bgcolor=#fefefe
| 390068 ||  || — || September 29, 2005 || Mount Lemmon || Mount Lemmon Survey || FLO || align=right data-sort-value="0.88" | 880 m || 
|-id=069 bgcolor=#E9E9E9
| 390069 ||  || — || October 19, 2003 || Kitt Peak || Spacewatch || — || align=right | 2.5 km || 
|-id=070 bgcolor=#fefefe
| 390070 ||  || — || February 3, 2000 || Kitt Peak || Spacewatch || — || align=right data-sort-value="0.87" | 870 m || 
|-id=071 bgcolor=#fefefe
| 390071 ||  || — || September 3, 2008 || Kitt Peak || Spacewatch || — || align=right | 1.0 km || 
|-id=072 bgcolor=#fefefe
| 390072 ||  || — || October 29, 2005 || Kitt Peak || Spacewatch || — || align=right data-sort-value="0.79" | 790 m || 
|-id=073 bgcolor=#E9E9E9
| 390073 ||  || — || September 28, 2003 || Kitt Peak || Spacewatch || — || align=right | 2.0 km || 
|-id=074 bgcolor=#E9E9E9
| 390074 ||  || — || January 28, 2009 || Catalina || CSS || DOR || align=right | 2.5 km || 
|-id=075 bgcolor=#d6d6d6
| 390075 ||  || — || November 9, 2007 || Kitt Peak || Spacewatch || — || align=right | 2.9 km || 
|-id=076 bgcolor=#d6d6d6
| 390076 ||  || — || March 12, 2005 || Kitt Peak || Spacewatch || — || align=right | 2.7 km || 
|-id=077 bgcolor=#d6d6d6
| 390077 ||  || — || December 31, 2008 || Kitt Peak || Spacewatch || — || align=right | 2.4 km || 
|-id=078 bgcolor=#E9E9E9
| 390078 ||  || — || October 18, 2003 || Kitt Peak || Spacewatch || — || align=right | 2.5 km || 
|-id=079 bgcolor=#E9E9E9
| 390079 ||  || — || September 22, 2008 || Mount Lemmon || Mount Lemmon Survey || — || align=right data-sort-value="0.94" | 940 m || 
|-id=080 bgcolor=#E9E9E9
| 390080 ||  || — || February 18, 2010 || Kitt Peak || Spacewatch || — || align=right | 1.4 km || 
|-id=081 bgcolor=#E9E9E9
| 390081 ||  || — || January 31, 2006 || Kitt Peak || Spacewatch || — || align=right | 1.5 km || 
|-id=082 bgcolor=#E9E9E9
| 390082 ||  || — || October 2, 2003 || Kitt Peak || Spacewatch || — || align=right | 1.7 km || 
|-id=083 bgcolor=#E9E9E9
| 390083 ||  || — || March 13, 2010 || Mount Lemmon || Mount Lemmon Survey || — || align=right | 1.4 km || 
|-id=084 bgcolor=#E9E9E9
| 390084 ||  || — || April 21, 2006 || Kitt Peak || Spacewatch || — || align=right | 2.5 km || 
|-id=085 bgcolor=#d6d6d6
| 390085 ||  || — || November 25, 2005 || Mount Lemmon || Mount Lemmon Survey || Tj (2.97) || align=right | 2.8 km || 
|-id=086 bgcolor=#E9E9E9
| 390086 ||  || — || December 1, 2008 || Mount Lemmon || Mount Lemmon Survey || — || align=right | 1.4 km || 
|-id=087 bgcolor=#d6d6d6
| 390087 ||  || — || November 14, 2007 || Kitt Peak || Spacewatch || — || align=right | 2.8 km || 
|-id=088 bgcolor=#d6d6d6
| 390088 ||  || — || September 19, 2006 || Kitt Peak || Spacewatch || — || align=right | 2.9 km || 
|-id=089 bgcolor=#E9E9E9
| 390089 ||  || — || April 20, 2010 || Kitt Peak || Spacewatch || — || align=right | 2.9 km || 
|-id=090 bgcolor=#E9E9E9
| 390090 ||  || — || March 8, 2005 || Anderson Mesa || LONEOS || MRX || align=right | 1.1 km || 
|-id=091 bgcolor=#E9E9E9
| 390091 ||  || — || September 30, 2003 || Kitt Peak || Spacewatch || MAR || align=right | 1.3 km || 
|-id=092 bgcolor=#E9E9E9
| 390092 ||  || — || November 24, 2003 || Kitt Peak || Spacewatch || AGN || align=right | 1.0 km || 
|-id=093 bgcolor=#d6d6d6
| 390093 ||  || — || February 21, 2009 || Kitt Peak || Spacewatch || — || align=right | 2.2 km || 
|-id=094 bgcolor=#E9E9E9
| 390094 ||  || — || April 18, 2002 || Kitt Peak || Spacewatch || — || align=right | 1.5 km || 
|-id=095 bgcolor=#d6d6d6
| 390095 ||  || — || November 1, 2007 || Kitt Peak || Spacewatch || — || align=right | 2.3 km || 
|-id=096 bgcolor=#E9E9E9
| 390096 ||  || — || September 22, 2003 || Kitt Peak || Spacewatch || — || align=right | 1.4 km || 
|-id=097 bgcolor=#E9E9E9
| 390097 ||  || — || September 9, 2007 || Kitt Peak || Spacewatch || WIT || align=right | 1.1 km || 
|-id=098 bgcolor=#E9E9E9
| 390098 ||  || — || March 17, 2001 || Kitt Peak || Spacewatch || JUN || align=right | 1.3 km || 
|-id=099 bgcolor=#d6d6d6
| 390099 ||  || — || February 1, 2009 || Kitt Peak || Spacewatch || EOS || align=right | 1.7 km || 
|-id=100 bgcolor=#fefefe
| 390100 ||  || — || September 30, 1997 || Kitt Peak || Spacewatch || — || align=right | 1.0 km || 
|}

390101–390200 

|-bgcolor=#d6d6d6
| 390101 ||  || — || June 11, 2010 || Mount Lemmon || Mount Lemmon Survey || EOS || align=right | 2.3 km || 
|-id=102 bgcolor=#d6d6d6
| 390102 ||  || — || November 5, 2012 || Kitt Peak || Spacewatch || — || align=right | 3.2 km || 
|-id=103 bgcolor=#d6d6d6
| 390103 ||  || — || December 15, 2007 || Kitt Peak || Spacewatch || — || align=right | 2.4 km || 
|-id=104 bgcolor=#E9E9E9
| 390104 ||  || — || April 17, 2001 || Kitt Peak || Spacewatch || — || align=right | 2.5 km || 
|-id=105 bgcolor=#E9E9E9
| 390105 ||  || — || October 23, 2008 || Kitt Peak || Spacewatch || — || align=right | 1.3 km || 
|-id=106 bgcolor=#E9E9E9
| 390106 ||  || — || October 1, 2003 || Kitt Peak || Spacewatch || — || align=right | 2.0 km || 
|-id=107 bgcolor=#fefefe
| 390107 ||  || — || November 19, 2009 || Mount Lemmon || Mount Lemmon Survey || — || align=right data-sort-value="0.83" | 830 m || 
|-id=108 bgcolor=#fefefe
| 390108 ||  || — || November 19, 2001 || Socorro || LINEAR || V || align=right data-sort-value="0.85" | 850 m || 
|-id=109 bgcolor=#d6d6d6
| 390109 ||  || — || February 28, 2009 || Mount Lemmon || Mount Lemmon Survey || — || align=right | 2.5 km || 
|-id=110 bgcolor=#d6d6d6
| 390110 ||  || — || November 3, 2007 || Kitt Peak || Spacewatch || EOS || align=right | 2.1 km || 
|-id=111 bgcolor=#E9E9E9
| 390111 ||  || — || December 18, 2004 || Mount Lemmon || Mount Lemmon Survey || — || align=right | 1.3 km || 
|-id=112 bgcolor=#E9E9E9
| 390112 ||  || — || December 2, 2004 || Kitt Peak || Spacewatch || — || align=right | 1.3 km || 
|-id=113 bgcolor=#fefefe
| 390113 ||  || — || April 13, 2011 || Mount Lemmon || Mount Lemmon Survey || V || align=right data-sort-value="0.72" | 720 m || 
|-id=114 bgcolor=#E9E9E9
| 390114 ||  || — || March 11, 1996 || Kitt Peak || Spacewatch || NEM || align=right | 2.4 km || 
|-id=115 bgcolor=#fefefe
| 390115 ||  || — || December 18, 2001 || Socorro || LINEAR || — || align=right data-sort-value="0.70" | 700 m || 
|-id=116 bgcolor=#fefefe
| 390116 ||  || — || December 4, 2005 || Kitt Peak || Spacewatch || FLO || align=right data-sort-value="0.67" | 670 m || 
|-id=117 bgcolor=#E9E9E9
| 390117 ||  || — || October 22, 1995 || Kitt Peak || Spacewatch || — || align=right | 1.2 km || 
|-id=118 bgcolor=#E9E9E9
| 390118 ||  || — || March 26, 2006 || Kitt Peak || Spacewatch || — || align=right | 1.6 km || 
|-id=119 bgcolor=#d6d6d6
| 390119 ||  || — || January 27, 2003 || Socorro || LINEAR || — || align=right | 3.0 km || 
|-id=120 bgcolor=#d6d6d6
| 390120 ||  || — || November 2, 2007 || Mount Lemmon || Mount Lemmon Survey || CHA || align=right | 2.1 km || 
|-id=121 bgcolor=#E9E9E9
| 390121 ||  || — || October 28, 2008 || Mount Lemmon || Mount Lemmon Survey || — || align=right | 1.1 km || 
|-id=122 bgcolor=#E9E9E9
| 390122 ||  || — || September 18, 2003 || Kitt Peak || Spacewatch || PAD || align=right | 1.6 km || 
|-id=123 bgcolor=#E9E9E9
| 390123 ||  || — || November 9, 1999 || Kitt Peak || Spacewatch || — || align=right | 1.7 km || 
|-id=124 bgcolor=#d6d6d6
| 390124 ||  || — || November 18, 2007 || Mount Lemmon || Mount Lemmon Survey || — || align=right | 2.0 km || 
|-id=125 bgcolor=#E9E9E9
| 390125 ||  || — || March 13, 2005 || Kitt Peak || Spacewatch || AGN || align=right | 1.2 km || 
|-id=126 bgcolor=#E9E9E9
| 390126 ||  || — || April 9, 2010 || Kitt Peak || Spacewatch || — || align=right | 2.4 km || 
|-id=127 bgcolor=#fefefe
| 390127 ||  || — || December 23, 2005 || Kitt Peak || Spacewatch || — || align=right data-sort-value="0.73" | 730 m || 
|-id=128 bgcolor=#fefefe
| 390128 ||  || — || November 27, 2009 || Mount Lemmon || Mount Lemmon Survey || — || align=right | 1.0 km || 
|-id=129 bgcolor=#fefefe
| 390129 ||  || — || April 3, 2003 || Anderson Mesa || LONEOS || MAS || align=right data-sort-value="0.80" | 800 m || 
|-id=130 bgcolor=#E9E9E9
| 390130 ||  || — || September 29, 2003 || Kitt Peak || Spacewatch || HEN || align=right data-sort-value="0.79" | 790 m || 
|-id=131 bgcolor=#E9E9E9
| 390131 ||  || — || January 16, 2005 || Kitt Peak || Spacewatch || — || align=right | 1.6 km || 
|-id=132 bgcolor=#fefefe
| 390132 ||  || — || October 29, 2005 || Kitt Peak || Spacewatch || FLO || align=right data-sort-value="0.63" | 630 m || 
|-id=133 bgcolor=#E9E9E9
| 390133 ||  || — || July 1, 2011 || Kitt Peak || Spacewatch || — || align=right | 1.1 km || 
|-id=134 bgcolor=#d6d6d6
| 390134 ||  || — || March 30, 2004 || Kitt Peak || Spacewatch || TEL || align=right | 1.3 km || 
|-id=135 bgcolor=#d6d6d6
| 390135 ||  || — || October 20, 2007 || Mount Lemmon || Mount Lemmon Survey || KOR || align=right | 1.5 km || 
|-id=136 bgcolor=#E9E9E9
| 390136 ||  || — || December 2, 2008 || Mount Lemmon || Mount Lemmon Survey || — || align=right | 1.7 km || 
|-id=137 bgcolor=#E9E9E9
| 390137 ||  || — || January 13, 1996 || Kitt Peak || Spacewatch || — || align=right | 1.4 km || 
|-id=138 bgcolor=#fefefe
| 390138 ||  || — || September 19, 1998 || Caussols || ODAS || V || align=right data-sort-value="0.65" | 650 m || 
|-id=139 bgcolor=#fefefe
| 390139 ||  || — || October 29, 2005 || Mount Lemmon || Mount Lemmon Survey || NYS || align=right data-sort-value="0.70" | 700 m || 
|-id=140 bgcolor=#E9E9E9
| 390140 ||  || — || November 30, 2008 || Kitt Peak || Spacewatch || — || align=right | 1.8 km || 
|-id=141 bgcolor=#d6d6d6
| 390141 ||  || — || December 4, 2007 || Mount Lemmon || Mount Lemmon Survey || THM || align=right | 2.2 km || 
|-id=142 bgcolor=#E9E9E9
| 390142 ||  || — || February 1, 2005 || Kitt Peak || Spacewatch || HEN || align=right data-sort-value="0.94" | 940 m || 
|-id=143 bgcolor=#d6d6d6
| 390143 ||  || — || March 29, 2004 || Kitt Peak || Spacewatch || — || align=right | 2.8 km || 
|-id=144 bgcolor=#d6d6d6
| 390144 ||  || — || December 16, 2007 || Kitt Peak || Spacewatch || — || align=right | 3.3 km || 
|-id=145 bgcolor=#d6d6d6
| 390145 ||  || — || October 12, 2007 || Mount Lemmon || Mount Lemmon Survey || — || align=right | 2.0 km || 
|-id=146 bgcolor=#E9E9E9
| 390146 ||  || — || December 21, 2008 || Catalina || CSS || EUN || align=right | 1.3 km || 
|-id=147 bgcolor=#E9E9E9
| 390147 ||  || — || September 19, 2003 || Kitt Peak || Spacewatch || — || align=right | 1.5 km || 
|-id=148 bgcolor=#E9E9E9
| 390148 ||  || — || March 8, 2005 || Kitt Peak || Spacewatch || WIT || align=right data-sort-value="0.96" | 960 m || 
|-id=149 bgcolor=#d6d6d6
| 390149 ||  || — || March 31, 2009 || Mount Lemmon || Mount Lemmon Survey || — || align=right | 4.1 km || 
|-id=150 bgcolor=#E9E9E9
| 390150 ||  || — || June 10, 2011 || Mount Lemmon || Mount Lemmon Survey || RAF || align=right | 1.3 km || 
|-id=151 bgcolor=#E9E9E9
| 390151 ||  || — || November 15, 1995 || Kitt Peak || Spacewatch || — || align=right | 1.4 km || 
|-id=152 bgcolor=#E9E9E9
| 390152 ||  || — || December 31, 2008 || Mount Lemmon || Mount Lemmon Survey || HOF || align=right | 2.8 km || 
|-id=153 bgcolor=#E9E9E9
| 390153 ||  || — || November 19, 2003 || Kitt Peak || Spacewatch || — || align=right | 2.1 km || 
|-id=154 bgcolor=#d6d6d6
| 390154 ||  || — || October 9, 2007 || Mount Lemmon || Mount Lemmon Survey || KOR || align=right | 1.2 km || 
|-id=155 bgcolor=#E9E9E9
| 390155 ||  || — || October 10, 2007 || Mount Lemmon || Mount Lemmon Survey || — || align=right | 2.4 km || 
|-id=156 bgcolor=#E9E9E9
| 390156 ||  || — || April 2, 2005 || Mount Lemmon || Mount Lemmon Survey || AGN || align=right | 1.0 km || 
|-id=157 bgcolor=#E9E9E9
| 390157 ||  || — || September 13, 2007 || Mount Lemmon || Mount Lemmon Survey || HEN || align=right | 1.0 km || 
|-id=158 bgcolor=#d6d6d6
| 390158 ||  || — || July 28, 2011 || Siding Spring || SSS || TEL || align=right | 1.8 km || 
|-id=159 bgcolor=#E9E9E9
| 390159 ||  || — || October 10, 2012 || Catalina || CSS || — || align=right | 1.6 km || 
|-id=160 bgcolor=#E9E9E9
| 390160 ||  || — || October 21, 2003 || Kitt Peak || Spacewatch || WIT || align=right | 1.2 km || 
|-id=161 bgcolor=#d6d6d6
| 390161 ||  || — || April 6, 2005 || Mount Lemmon || Mount Lemmon Survey || KOR || align=right | 1.5 km || 
|-id=162 bgcolor=#E9E9E9
| 390162 ||  || — || April 2, 2006 || Kitt Peak || Spacewatch || — || align=right data-sort-value="0.99" | 990 m || 
|-id=163 bgcolor=#d6d6d6
| 390163 ||  || — || October 15, 2007 || Mount Lemmon || Mount Lemmon Survey || — || align=right | 2.0 km || 
|-id=164 bgcolor=#d6d6d6
| 390164 ||  || — || January 9, 2006 || Kitt Peak || Spacewatch || SHU3:2 || align=right | 3.8 km || 
|-id=165 bgcolor=#E9E9E9
| 390165 ||  || — || December 1, 2003 || Kitt Peak || Spacewatch || WIT || align=right data-sort-value="0.93" | 930 m || 
|-id=166 bgcolor=#d6d6d6
| 390166 ||  || — || October 15, 2007 || Kitt Peak || Spacewatch || — || align=right | 2.4 km || 
|-id=167 bgcolor=#E9E9E9
| 390167 ||  || — || December 5, 2008 || Kitt Peak || Spacewatch || — || align=right | 1.5 km || 
|-id=168 bgcolor=#d6d6d6
| 390168 ||  || — || October 10, 2007 || Mount Lemmon || Mount Lemmon Survey || — || align=right | 2.6 km || 
|-id=169 bgcolor=#d6d6d6
| 390169 ||  || — || October 11, 1997 || Kitt Peak || Spacewatch || — || align=right | 2.6 km || 
|-id=170 bgcolor=#E9E9E9
| 390170 ||  || — || September 13, 2007 || Mount Lemmon || Mount Lemmon Survey || HEN || align=right | 1.2 km || 
|-id=171 bgcolor=#E9E9E9
| 390171 ||  || — || September 18, 2003 || Kitt Peak || Spacewatch || — || align=right | 1.6 km || 
|-id=172 bgcolor=#E9E9E9
| 390172 ||  || — || September 14, 2007 || Mount Lemmon || Mount Lemmon Survey || HEN || align=right | 1.1 km || 
|-id=173 bgcolor=#d6d6d6
| 390173 ||  || — || September 28, 2006 || Kitt Peak || Spacewatch || — || align=right | 2.9 km || 
|-id=174 bgcolor=#d6d6d6
| 390174 ||  || — || December 28, 2005 || Kitt Peak || Spacewatch || 3:2 || align=right | 3.6 km || 
|-id=175 bgcolor=#fefefe
| 390175 ||  || — || September 30, 2005 || Mount Lemmon || Mount Lemmon Survey || — || align=right data-sort-value="0.66" | 660 m || 
|-id=176 bgcolor=#fefefe
| 390176 ||  || — || March 16, 2007 || Kitt Peak || Spacewatch || V || align=right data-sort-value="0.76" | 760 m || 
|-id=177 bgcolor=#fefefe
| 390177 ||  || — || October 20, 2001 || Socorro || LINEAR || — || align=right data-sort-value="0.93" | 930 m || 
|-id=178 bgcolor=#E9E9E9
| 390178 ||  || — || October 21, 2003 || Kitt Peak || Spacewatch || — || align=right | 2.5 km || 
|-id=179 bgcolor=#fefefe
| 390179 ||  || — || April 20, 2007 || Mount Lemmon || Mount Lemmon Survey || CLA || align=right | 1.9 km || 
|-id=180 bgcolor=#d6d6d6
| 390180 ||  || — || September 25, 2006 || Mount Lemmon || Mount Lemmon Survey || THM || align=right | 1.9 km || 
|-id=181 bgcolor=#d6d6d6
| 390181 ||  || — || October 10, 2007 || Mount Lemmon || Mount Lemmon Survey || — || align=right | 2.3 km || 
|-id=182 bgcolor=#E9E9E9
| 390182 ||  || — || February 25, 2006 || Kitt Peak || Spacewatch || — || align=right | 2.8 km || 
|-id=183 bgcolor=#E9E9E9
| 390183 ||  || — || September 13, 2007 || Mount Lemmon || Mount Lemmon Survey || NEM || align=right | 2.5 km || 
|-id=184 bgcolor=#E9E9E9
| 390184 ||  || — || March 8, 2005 || Mount Lemmon || Mount Lemmon Survey || — || align=right | 1.9 km || 
|-id=185 bgcolor=#E9E9E9
| 390185 ||  || — || December 21, 2008 || Catalina || CSS || — || align=right | 1.2 km || 
|-id=186 bgcolor=#E9E9E9
| 390186 ||  || — || December 22, 2000 || Kitt Peak || Spacewatch || — || align=right | 1.2 km || 
|-id=187 bgcolor=#d6d6d6
| 390187 ||  || — || November 17, 2007 || Mount Lemmon || Mount Lemmon Survey || — || align=right | 2.7 km || 
|-id=188 bgcolor=#E9E9E9
| 390188 ||  || — || September 9, 2007 || Kitt Peak || Spacewatch || — || align=right | 2.5 km || 
|-id=189 bgcolor=#fefefe
| 390189 ||  || — || October 3, 2002 || Socorro || LINEAR || — || align=right data-sort-value="0.77" | 770 m || 
|-id=190 bgcolor=#E9E9E9
| 390190 ||  || — || March 19, 2010 || Kitt Peak || Spacewatch || — || align=right data-sort-value="0.93" | 930 m || 
|-id=191 bgcolor=#E9E9E9
| 390191 ||  || — || October 21, 2003 || Kitt Peak || Spacewatch || — || align=right | 1.9 km || 
|-id=192 bgcolor=#d6d6d6
| 390192 ||  || — || October 3, 2006 || Mount Lemmon || Mount Lemmon Survey || VER || align=right | 3.0 km || 
|-id=193 bgcolor=#E9E9E9
| 390193 ||  || — || September 12, 2007 || Kitt Peak || Spacewatch || — || align=right | 1.7 km || 
|-id=194 bgcolor=#d6d6d6
| 390194 ||  || — || December 29, 2003 || Kitt Peak || Spacewatch || CHA || align=right | 2.1 km || 
|-id=195 bgcolor=#fefefe
| 390195 ||  || — || August 16, 2001 || Prescott || P. G. Comba || — || align=right data-sort-value="0.97" | 970 m || 
|-id=196 bgcolor=#E9E9E9
| 390196 ||  || — || December 7, 2008 || Mount Lemmon || Mount Lemmon Survey || — || align=right | 3.1 km || 
|-id=197 bgcolor=#E9E9E9
| 390197 ||  || — || December 31, 2008 || Mount Lemmon || Mount Lemmon Survey || PAD || align=right | 1.9 km || 
|-id=198 bgcolor=#E9E9E9
| 390198 ||  || — || November 29, 2000 || Kitt Peak || Spacewatch || — || align=right | 1.2 km || 
|-id=199 bgcolor=#fefefe
| 390199 ||  || — || June 14, 2004 || Socorro || LINEAR || — || align=right | 1.4 km || 
|-id=200 bgcolor=#fefefe
| 390200 ||  || — || September 6, 2008 || Mount Lemmon || Mount Lemmon Survey || MAS || align=right data-sort-value="0.82" | 820 m || 
|}

390201–390300 

|-bgcolor=#d6d6d6
| 390201 ||  || — || September 26, 2006 || Kitt Peak || Spacewatch || — || align=right | 2.8 km || 
|-id=202 bgcolor=#d6d6d6
| 390202 ||  || — || October 14, 2007 || Mount Lemmon || Mount Lemmon Survey || — || align=right | 3.2 km || 
|-id=203 bgcolor=#E9E9E9
| 390203 ||  || — || September 18, 2003 || Kitt Peak || Spacewatch || — || align=right | 1.4 km || 
|-id=204 bgcolor=#d6d6d6
| 390204 ||  || — || February 13, 2004 || Kitt Peak || Spacewatch || 615 || align=right | 1.9 km || 
|-id=205 bgcolor=#fefefe
| 390205 ||  || — || February 6, 2006 || Kitt Peak || Spacewatch || — || align=right | 1.0 km || 
|-id=206 bgcolor=#fefefe
| 390206 ||  || — || December 15, 2009 || Mount Lemmon || Mount Lemmon Survey || V || align=right data-sort-value="0.80" | 800 m || 
|-id=207 bgcolor=#E9E9E9
| 390207 ||  || — || January 13, 2005 || Kitt Peak || Spacewatch || — || align=right | 1.7 km || 
|-id=208 bgcolor=#E9E9E9
| 390208 ||  || — || January 19, 2005 || Kitt Peak || Spacewatch || — || align=right | 1.5 km || 
|-id=209 bgcolor=#E9E9E9
| 390209 ||  || — || September 12, 2007 || Mount Lemmon || Mount Lemmon Survey || AST || align=right | 1.4 km || 
|-id=210 bgcolor=#E9E9E9
| 390210 ||  || — || October 19, 2003 || Kitt Peak || Spacewatch || — || align=right | 1.7 km || 
|-id=211 bgcolor=#E9E9E9
| 390211 ||  || — || May 2, 2006 || Mount Lemmon || Mount Lemmon Survey || — || align=right | 1.6 km || 
|-id=212 bgcolor=#d6d6d6
| 390212 ||  || — || November 18, 2007 || Kitt Peak || Spacewatch || — || align=right | 2.5 km || 
|-id=213 bgcolor=#d6d6d6
| 390213 ||  || — || November 18, 2007 || Mount Lemmon || Mount Lemmon Survey || HYG || align=right | 2.7 km || 
|-id=214 bgcolor=#d6d6d6
| 390214 ||  || — || October 22, 2006 || Kitt Peak || Spacewatch || HYG || align=right | 2.5 km || 
|-id=215 bgcolor=#fefefe
| 390215 ||  || — || September 25, 2005 || Kitt Peak || Spacewatch || — || align=right data-sort-value="0.79" | 790 m || 
|-id=216 bgcolor=#d6d6d6
| 390216 ||  || — || November 6, 2007 || Kitt Peak || Spacewatch || KOR || align=right | 1.5 km || 
|-id=217 bgcolor=#d6d6d6
| 390217 ||  || — || September 15, 2007 || Mount Lemmon || Mount Lemmon Survey || KOR || align=right | 1.7 km || 
|-id=218 bgcolor=#E9E9E9
| 390218 ||  || — || January 27, 2004 || Kitt Peak || Spacewatch || AGN || align=right | 1.1 km || 
|-id=219 bgcolor=#E9E9E9
| 390219 ||  || — || November 19, 2003 || Kitt Peak || Spacewatch || — || align=right | 2.0 km || 
|-id=220 bgcolor=#d6d6d6
| 390220 ||  || — || September 30, 2006 || Mount Lemmon || Mount Lemmon Survey || — || align=right | 2.8 km || 
|-id=221 bgcolor=#E9E9E9
| 390221 ||  || — || December 16, 2004 || Socorro || LINEAR || — || align=right | 1.2 km || 
|-id=222 bgcolor=#E9E9E9
| 390222 ||  || — || March 24, 2006 || Mount Lemmon || Mount Lemmon Survey || — || align=right | 1.1 km || 
|-id=223 bgcolor=#fefefe
| 390223 ||  || — || October 14, 1998 || Kitt Peak || Spacewatch || — || align=right data-sort-value="0.82" | 820 m || 
|-id=224 bgcolor=#E9E9E9
| 390224 ||  || — || April 9, 2002 || Kitt Peak || Spacewatch || — || align=right data-sort-value="0.85" | 850 m || 
|-id=225 bgcolor=#E9E9E9
| 390225 ||  || — || April 24, 2006 || Kitt Peak || Spacewatch || — || align=right | 1.8 km || 
|-id=226 bgcolor=#d6d6d6
| 390226 ||  || — || August 29, 2006 || Kitt Peak || Spacewatch || CHA || align=right | 2.0 km || 
|-id=227 bgcolor=#d6d6d6
| 390227 ||  || — || September 15, 2007 || Mount Lemmon || Mount Lemmon Survey || KAR || align=right | 1.1 km || 
|-id=228 bgcolor=#E9E9E9
| 390228 ||  || — || January 17, 2005 || Kitt Peak || Spacewatch || — || align=right | 1.5 km || 
|-id=229 bgcolor=#d6d6d6
| 390229 ||  || — || December 31, 1997 || Kitt Peak || Spacewatch || — || align=right | 2.7 km || 
|-id=230 bgcolor=#E9E9E9
| 390230 ||  || — || May 19, 2006 || Mount Lemmon || Mount Lemmon Survey || — || align=right | 2.8 km || 
|-id=231 bgcolor=#d6d6d6
| 390231 ||  || — || February 28, 2009 || Kitt Peak || Spacewatch || — || align=right | 2.6 km || 
|-id=232 bgcolor=#fefefe
| 390232 ||  || — || October 5, 2004 || Kitt Peak || Spacewatch || — || align=right data-sort-value="0.79" | 790 m || 
|-id=233 bgcolor=#E9E9E9
| 390233 ||  || — || October 11, 2007 || Kitt Peak || Spacewatch || WIT || align=right | 1.2 km || 
|-id=234 bgcolor=#d6d6d6
| 390234 ||  || — || November 17, 2006 || Mount Lemmon || Mount Lemmon Survey || — || align=right | 3.7 km || 
|-id=235 bgcolor=#d6d6d6
| 390235 ||  || — || December 31, 2002 || Socorro || LINEAR || — || align=right | 3.6 km || 
|-id=236 bgcolor=#E9E9E9
| 390236 ||  || — || January 8, 2010 || WISE || WISE || — || align=right | 1.3 km || 
|-id=237 bgcolor=#fefefe
| 390237 ||  || — || October 8, 2008 || Kitt Peak || Spacewatch || — || align=right data-sort-value="0.85" | 850 m || 
|-id=238 bgcolor=#d6d6d6
| 390238 ||  || — || October 23, 2006 || Mount Lemmon || Mount Lemmon Survey || — || align=right | 2.9 km || 
|-id=239 bgcolor=#E9E9E9
| 390239 ||  || — || May 9, 2010 || Mount Lemmon || Mount Lemmon Survey || — || align=right | 1.7 km || 
|-id=240 bgcolor=#d6d6d6
| 390240 ||  || — || December 4, 2007 || Catalina || CSS || — || align=right | 3.3 km || 
|-id=241 bgcolor=#d6d6d6
| 390241 ||  || — || June 12, 2011 || Mount Lemmon || Mount Lemmon Survey || — || align=right | 3.4 km || 
|-id=242 bgcolor=#d6d6d6
| 390242 ||  || — || February 28, 2009 || Mount Lemmon || Mount Lemmon Survey || — || align=right | 2.4 km || 
|-id=243 bgcolor=#fefefe
| 390243 ||  || — || January 7, 2006 || Kitt Peak || Spacewatch || — || align=right | 1.0 km || 
|-id=244 bgcolor=#fefefe
| 390244 ||  || — || September 11, 2004 || Kitt Peak || Spacewatch || — || align=right data-sort-value="0.90" | 900 m || 
|-id=245 bgcolor=#fefefe
| 390245 ||  || — || February 17, 2010 || Kitt Peak || Spacewatch || V || align=right data-sort-value="0.74" | 740 m || 
|-id=246 bgcolor=#d6d6d6
| 390246 ||  || — || June 9, 2005 || Kitt Peak || Spacewatch || TIR || align=right | 3.2 km || 
|-id=247 bgcolor=#d6d6d6
| 390247 ||  || — || March 29, 2004 || Kitt Peak || Spacewatch || — || align=right | 3.5 km || 
|-id=248 bgcolor=#E9E9E9
| 390248 ||  || — || February 7, 2010 || WISE || WISE || NEM || align=right | 2.8 km || 
|-id=249 bgcolor=#d6d6d6
| 390249 ||  || — || November 17, 2007 || Kitt Peak || Spacewatch || KOR || align=right | 1.3 km || 
|-id=250 bgcolor=#d6d6d6
| 390250 ||  || — || February 2, 2008 || Mount Lemmon || Mount Lemmon Survey || 7:4 || align=right | 3.2 km || 
|-id=251 bgcolor=#E9E9E9
| 390251 ||  || — || December 12, 2004 || Kitt Peak || Spacewatch || — || align=right | 1.4 km || 
|-id=252 bgcolor=#E9E9E9
| 390252 ||  || — || April 14, 2010 || Catalina || CSS || ADE || align=right | 3.1 km || 
|-id=253 bgcolor=#E9E9E9
| 390253 ||  || — || October 5, 2007 || Kitt Peak || Spacewatch || — || align=right | 2.8 km || 
|-id=254 bgcolor=#d6d6d6
| 390254 ||  || — || November 5, 2007 || Mount Lemmon || Mount Lemmon Survey || KOR || align=right | 1.7 km || 
|-id=255 bgcolor=#d6d6d6
| 390255 ||  || — || April 24, 2010 || WISE || WISE || — || align=right | 5.4 km || 
|-id=256 bgcolor=#E9E9E9
| 390256 ||  || — || December 10, 2004 || Kitt Peak || Spacewatch || — || align=right | 1.6 km || 
|-id=257 bgcolor=#d6d6d6
| 390257 ||  || — || September 19, 2006 || Catalina || CSS || HYG || align=right | 2.8 km || 
|-id=258 bgcolor=#d6d6d6
| 390258 ||  || — || October 21, 2006 || Kitt Peak || Spacewatch || HYG || align=right | 2.8 km || 
|-id=259 bgcolor=#d6d6d6
| 390259 ||  || — || January 30, 2004 || Kitt Peak || Spacewatch || KOR || align=right | 1.4 km || 
|-id=260 bgcolor=#E9E9E9
| 390260 ||  || — || December 1, 2008 || Kitt Peak || Spacewatch || fast? || align=right | 1.2 km || 
|-id=261 bgcolor=#E9E9E9
| 390261 ||  || — || November 21, 2008 || Kitt Peak || Spacewatch || — || align=right | 1.4 km || 
|-id=262 bgcolor=#E9E9E9
| 390262 ||  || — || November 24, 2008 || Kitt Peak || Spacewatch || — || align=right | 1.3 km || 
|-id=263 bgcolor=#d6d6d6
| 390263 ||  || — || November 12, 2007 || Mount Lemmon || Mount Lemmon Survey || — || align=right | 2.9 km || 
|-id=264 bgcolor=#d6d6d6
| 390264 ||  || — || August 21, 2006 || Kitt Peak || Spacewatch || HYG || align=right | 2.8 km || 
|-id=265 bgcolor=#E9E9E9
| 390265 ||  || — || October 15, 2007 || Mount Lemmon || Mount Lemmon Survey || — || align=right | 2.6 km || 
|-id=266 bgcolor=#d6d6d6
| 390266 ||  || — || October 21, 2007 || Mount Lemmon || Mount Lemmon Survey || — || align=right | 3.7 km || 
|-id=267 bgcolor=#E9E9E9
| 390267 ||  || — || December 3, 2008 || Mount Lemmon || Mount Lemmon Survey || — || align=right | 2.7 km || 
|-id=268 bgcolor=#E9E9E9
| 390268 ||  || — || February 27, 2006 || Kitt Peak || Spacewatch || — || align=right | 1.0 km || 
|-id=269 bgcolor=#d6d6d6
| 390269 ||  || — || September 10, 2007 || Mount Lemmon || Mount Lemmon Survey || — || align=right | 2.2 km || 
|-id=270 bgcolor=#d6d6d6
| 390270 ||  || — || July 5, 2005 || Kitt Peak || Spacewatch || — || align=right | 4.5 km || 
|-id=271 bgcolor=#d6d6d6
| 390271 ||  || — || April 20, 2010 || Mount Lemmon || Mount Lemmon Survey || — || align=right | 3.2 km || 
|-id=272 bgcolor=#d6d6d6
| 390272 ||  || — || November 3, 2007 || Kitt Peak || Spacewatch || KOR || align=right | 1.4 km || 
|-id=273 bgcolor=#E9E9E9
| 390273 ||  || — || December 12, 2004 || Kitt Peak || Spacewatch || — || align=right | 1.3 km || 
|-id=274 bgcolor=#E9E9E9
| 390274 ||  || — || October 15, 2007 || Mount Lemmon || Mount Lemmon Survey || — || align=right | 2.4 km || 
|-id=275 bgcolor=#fefefe
| 390275 ||  || — || April 5, 2003 || Kitt Peak || Spacewatch || — || align=right | 1.2 km || 
|-id=276 bgcolor=#d6d6d6
| 390276 ||  || — || April 25, 2004 || Kitt Peak || Spacewatch || — || align=right | 3.6 km || 
|-id=277 bgcolor=#d6d6d6
| 390277 ||  || — || March 17, 2009 || Kitt Peak || Spacewatch || — || align=right | 2.7 km || 
|-id=278 bgcolor=#d6d6d6
| 390278 ||  || — || December 14, 2006 || Kitt Peak || Spacewatch || — || align=right | 4.9 km || 
|-id=279 bgcolor=#d6d6d6
| 390279 ||  || — || January 1, 2008 || Kitt Peak || Spacewatch || TEL || align=right | 2.0 km || 
|-id=280 bgcolor=#C2FFFF
| 390280 ||  || — || June 25, 2007 || Kitt Peak || Spacewatch || L4 || align=right | 9.4 km || 
|-id=281 bgcolor=#E9E9E9
| 390281 ||  || — || November 15, 1999 || Kitt Peak || Spacewatch || — || align=right | 1.7 km || 
|-id=282 bgcolor=#d6d6d6
| 390282 ||  || — || October 21, 2006 || Mount Lemmon || Mount Lemmon Survey || — || align=right | 3.5 km || 
|-id=283 bgcolor=#fefefe
| 390283 ||  || — || June 27, 2004 || Siding Spring || SSS || FLO || align=right data-sort-value="0.83" | 830 m || 
|-id=284 bgcolor=#d6d6d6
| 390284 ||  || — || December 18, 2001 || Socorro || LINEAR || — || align=right | 3.1 km || 
|-id=285 bgcolor=#d6d6d6
| 390285 ||  || — || November 13, 2006 || Catalina || CSS || EOS || align=right | 1.9 km || 
|-id=286 bgcolor=#d6d6d6
| 390286 ||  || — || September 1, 2000 || Socorro || LINEAR || — || align=right | 4.0 km || 
|-id=287 bgcolor=#d6d6d6
| 390287 ||  || — || November 27, 2006 || Kitt Peak || Spacewatch || — || align=right | 4.0 km || 
|-id=288 bgcolor=#C2FFFF
| 390288 ||  || — || October 28, 2010 || Mount Lemmon || Mount Lemmon Survey || L4 || align=right | 7.3 km || 
|-id=289 bgcolor=#E9E9E9
| 390289 ||  || — || October 18, 2007 || Mount Lemmon || Mount Lemmon Survey || — || align=right | 1.4 km || 
|-id=290 bgcolor=#E9E9E9
| 390290 ||  || — || May 6, 2006 || Mount Lemmon || Mount Lemmon Survey || — || align=right | 2.0 km || 
|-id=291 bgcolor=#d6d6d6
| 390291 ||  || — || August 22, 2001 || Kitt Peak || Spacewatch || — || align=right | 3.7 km || 
|-id=292 bgcolor=#E9E9E9
| 390292 ||  || — || April 9, 2002 || Socorro || LINEAR || — || align=right | 1.3 km || 
|-id=293 bgcolor=#E9E9E9
| 390293 ||  || — || January 20, 2009 || Mount Lemmon || Mount Lemmon Survey || — || align=right | 2.4 km || 
|-id=294 bgcolor=#d6d6d6
| 390294 ||  || — || November 10, 2006 || Kitt Peak || Spacewatch || — || align=right | 3.5 km || 
|-id=295 bgcolor=#E9E9E9
| 390295 ||  || — || June 11, 2005 || Kitt Peak || Spacewatch || — || align=right | 3.0 km || 
|-id=296 bgcolor=#C2FFFF
| 390296 ||  || — || October 10, 2010 || Mount Lemmon || Mount Lemmon Survey || L4 || align=right | 9.7 km || 
|-id=297 bgcolor=#d6d6d6
| 390297 ||  || — || October 2, 2006 || Mount Lemmon || Mount Lemmon Survey || — || align=right | 2.9 km || 
|-id=298 bgcolor=#d6d6d6
| 390298 ||  || — || November 13, 2006 || Catalina || CSS || — || align=right | 5.1 km || 
|-id=299 bgcolor=#d6d6d6
| 390299 ||  || — || September 20, 2006 || Catalina || CSS || — || align=right | 4.0 km || 
|-id=300 bgcolor=#C2FFFF
| 390300 ||  || — || March 26, 2003 || Kitt Peak || Spacewatch || L4 || align=right | 7.3 km || 
|}

390301–390400 

|-bgcolor=#C2FFFF
| 390301 ||  || — || October 17, 2010 || Mount Lemmon || Mount Lemmon Survey || L4 || align=right | 11 km || 
|-id=302 bgcolor=#d6d6d6
| 390302 ||  || — || March 15, 2004 || Kitt Peak || Spacewatch || — || align=right | 2.8 km || 
|-id=303 bgcolor=#C2FFFF
| 390303 ||  || — || January 6, 2000 || Kitt Peak || Spacewatch || L4 || align=right | 10 km || 
|-id=304 bgcolor=#d6d6d6
| 390304 ||  || — || May 16, 1999 || Kitt Peak || Spacewatch || EOS || align=right | 2.5 km || 
|-id=305 bgcolor=#d6d6d6
| 390305 ||  || — || April 17, 2009 || Kitt Peak || Spacewatch || — || align=right | 3.4 km || 
|-id=306 bgcolor=#d6d6d6
| 390306 ||  || — || October 15, 2007 || Mount Lemmon || Mount Lemmon Survey || EMA || align=right | 3.6 km || 
|-id=307 bgcolor=#E9E9E9
| 390307 ||  || — || February 26, 2009 || Kitt Peak || Spacewatch || — || align=right | 2.6 km || 
|-id=308 bgcolor=#C2FFFF
| 390308 ||  || — || November 18, 2011 || Kitt Peak || Spacewatch || L4 || align=right | 11 km || 
|-id=309 bgcolor=#C2FFFF
| 390309 ||  || — || June 21, 2007 || Mount Lemmon || Mount Lemmon Survey || L4 || align=right | 12 km || 
|-id=310 bgcolor=#E9E9E9
| 390310 ||  || — || November 7, 2008 || Mount Lemmon || Mount Lemmon Survey || — || align=right | 1.3 km || 
|-id=311 bgcolor=#C2FFFF
| 390311 ||  || — || November 14, 2010 || Catalina || CSS || L4 || align=right | 11 km || 
|-id=312 bgcolor=#d6d6d6
| 390312 ||  || — || October 8, 2005 || Catalina || CSS || — || align=right | 4.8 km || 
|-id=313 bgcolor=#d6d6d6
| 390313 ||  || — || November 2, 2000 || Kitt Peak || Spacewatch || — || align=right | 2.5 km || 
|-id=314 bgcolor=#E9E9E9
| 390314 ||  || — || May 24, 2006 || Mount Lemmon || Mount Lemmon Survey || — || align=right | 2.2 km || 
|-id=315 bgcolor=#d6d6d6
| 390315 ||  || — || September 30, 2006 || Catalina || CSS || EOS || align=right | 2.2 km || 
|-id=316 bgcolor=#C2FFFF
| 390316 ||  || — || March 5, 2002 || Kitt Peak || Spacewatch || L4 || align=right | 9.2 km || 
|-id=317 bgcolor=#C2FFFF
| 390317 ||  || — || November 8, 2010 || Mount Lemmon || Mount Lemmon Survey || L4 || align=right | 9.7 km || 
|-id=318 bgcolor=#d6d6d6
| 390318 ||  || — || February 29, 2008 || Mount Lemmon || Mount Lemmon Survey || — || align=right | 3.5 km || 
|-id=319 bgcolor=#d6d6d6
| 390319 ||  || — || August 30, 2005 || Kitt Peak || Spacewatch || — || align=right | 2.9 km || 
|-id=320 bgcolor=#d6d6d6
| 390320 ||  || — || February 23, 2003 || Campo Imperatore || CINEOS || — || align=right | 3.2 km || 
|-id=321 bgcolor=#d6d6d6
| 390321 ||  || — || May 7, 2010 || WISE || WISE || URS || align=right | 3.5 km || 
|-id=322 bgcolor=#C2FFFF
| 390322 ||  || — || October 17, 2009 || Mount Lemmon || Mount Lemmon Survey || L4ERY || align=right | 9.6 km || 
|-id=323 bgcolor=#C2FFFF
| 390323 ||  || — || October 18, 1998 || Kitt Peak || Spacewatch || L4 || align=right | 8.1 km || 
|-id=324 bgcolor=#E9E9E9
| 390324 ||  || — || February 27, 2006 || Kitt Peak || Spacewatch || — || align=right | 1.3 km || 
|-id=325 bgcolor=#C2FFFF
| 390325 ||  || — || September 10, 2007 || Mount Lemmon || Mount Lemmon Survey || L4 || align=right | 8.1 km || 
|-id=326 bgcolor=#C2FFFF
| 390326 ||  || — || September 19, 2009 || Mount Lemmon || Mount Lemmon Survey || L4 || align=right | 7.1 km || 
|-id=327 bgcolor=#d6d6d6
| 390327 ||  || — || January 10, 2008 || Mount Lemmon || Mount Lemmon Survey || — || align=right | 3.7 km || 
|-id=328 bgcolor=#C2FFFF
| 390328 ||  || — || September 29, 2009 || Mount Lemmon || Mount Lemmon Survey || L4 || align=right | 9.9 km || 
|-id=329 bgcolor=#C2FFFF
| 390329 ||  || — || September 15, 2009 || Kitt Peak || Spacewatch || L4 || align=right | 7.1 km || 
|-id=330 bgcolor=#C2FFFF
| 390330 ||  || — || December 28, 2000 || Kitt Peak || Spacewatch || L4 || align=right | 9.0 km || 
|-id=331 bgcolor=#C2FFFF
| 390331 ||  || — || September 13, 2007 || Mount Lemmon || Mount Lemmon Survey || L4 || align=right | 8.5 km || 
|-id=332 bgcolor=#E9E9E9
| 390332 ||  || — || December 19, 2007 || Kitt Peak || Spacewatch || — || align=right | 2.6 km || 
|-id=333 bgcolor=#C2FFFF
| 390333 ||  || — || October 12, 2010 || Mount Lemmon || Mount Lemmon Survey || L4 || align=right | 7.6 km || 
|-id=334 bgcolor=#C2FFFF
| 390334 ||  || — || January 3, 2001 || Kitt Peak || Spacewatch || L4 || align=right | 7.9 km || 
|-id=335 bgcolor=#d6d6d6
| 390335 ||  || — || February 7, 2008 || Kitt Peak || Spacewatch || — || align=right | 3.2 km || 
|-id=336 bgcolor=#C2FFFF
| 390336 ||  || — || September 28, 2009 || Mount Lemmon || Mount Lemmon Survey || L4 || align=right | 8.7 km || 
|-id=337 bgcolor=#C2FFFF
| 390337 ||  || — || September 4, 2008 || Kitt Peak || Spacewatch || L4 || align=right | 12 km || 
|-id=338 bgcolor=#C2FFFF
| 390338 ||  || — || February 2, 2001 || Kitt Peak || Spacewatch || L4 || align=right | 9.2 km || 
|-id=339 bgcolor=#C2FFFF
| 390339 ||  || — || November 14, 2010 || Mount Lemmon || Mount Lemmon Survey || L4 || align=right | 8.3 km || 
|-id=340 bgcolor=#C2FFFF
| 390340 ||  || — || January 29, 2010 || WISE || WISE || L4 || align=right | 10 km || 
|-id=341 bgcolor=#d6d6d6
| 390341 ||  || — || March 24, 2009 || Mount Lemmon || Mount Lemmon Survey || LIX || align=right | 4.2 km || 
|-id=342 bgcolor=#d6d6d6
| 390342 ||  || — || February 10, 2002 || Socorro || LINEAR || — || align=right | 4.3 km || 
|-id=343 bgcolor=#d6d6d6
| 390343 ||  || — || October 11, 2005 || Kitt Peak || Spacewatch || THM || align=right | 2.5 km || 
|-id=344 bgcolor=#C2FFFF
| 390344 ||  || — || September 10, 2007 || Mount Lemmon || Mount Lemmon Survey || L4ERY || align=right | 7.7 km || 
|-id=345 bgcolor=#C2FFFF
| 390345 ||  || — || January 5, 2000 || Kitt Peak || Spacewatch || L4 || align=right | 7.0 km || 
|-id=346 bgcolor=#C2FFFF
| 390346 ||  || — || September 27, 2009 || Mount Lemmon || Mount Lemmon Survey || L4 || align=right | 7.1 km || 
|-id=347 bgcolor=#C2FFFF
| 390347 ||  || — || December 4, 2010 || Mount Lemmon || Mount Lemmon Survey || L4ERY || align=right | 8.3 km || 
|-id=348 bgcolor=#d6d6d6
| 390348 ||  || — || December 10, 2001 || Kitt Peak || Spacewatch || EOS || align=right | 2.6 km || 
|-id=349 bgcolor=#C2FFFF
| 390349 ||  || — || May 13, 2004 || Kitt Peak || Spacewatch || L4ERY || align=right | 8.5 km || 
|-id=350 bgcolor=#C2FFFF
| 390350 ||  || — || August 24, 2008 || Kitt Peak || Spacewatch || L4 || align=right | 7.5 km || 
|-id=351 bgcolor=#C2FFFF
| 390351 ||  || — || September 20, 2009 || Mount Lemmon || Mount Lemmon Survey || L4 || align=right | 7.3 km || 
|-id=352 bgcolor=#C2FFFF
| 390352 ||  || — || September 4, 2008 || Kitt Peak || Spacewatch || L4ERY || align=right | 7.3 km || 
|-id=353 bgcolor=#C2FFFF
| 390353 ||  || — || October 18, 2009 || Catalina || CSS || L4 || align=right | 11 km || 
|-id=354 bgcolor=#C2FFFF
| 390354 ||  || — || October 3, 1997 || Caussols || ODAS || L4 || align=right | 11 km || 
|-id=355 bgcolor=#E9E9E9
| 390355 ||  || — || November 18, 2006 || Mount Lemmon || Mount Lemmon Survey || — || align=right | 4.1 km || 
|-id=356 bgcolor=#d6d6d6
| 390356 ||  || — || February 6, 1997 || Caussols || ODAS || — || align=right | 3.5 km || 
|-id=357 bgcolor=#C2FFFF
| 390357 ||  || — || September 15, 2009 || Kitt Peak || Spacewatch || L4 || align=right | 7.3 km || 
|-id=358 bgcolor=#C2FFFF
| 390358 ||  || — || January 16, 2000 || Kitt Peak || Spacewatch || L4ERY || align=right | 8.1 km || 
|-id=359 bgcolor=#d6d6d6
| 390359 ||  || — || July 16, 2010 || WISE || WISE || 7:4 || align=right | 4.6 km || 
|-id=360 bgcolor=#C2FFFF
| 390360 ||  || — || September 4, 2008 || Kitt Peak || Spacewatch || L4 || align=right | 7.7 km || 
|-id=361 bgcolor=#C2FFFF
| 390361 ||  || — || March 23, 2003 || Kitt Peak || Spacewatch || L4 || align=right | 9.2 km || 
|-id=362 bgcolor=#C2FFFF
| 390362 ||  || — || September 10, 2007 || Mount Lemmon || Mount Lemmon Survey || L4ERY || align=right | 7.9 km || 
|-id=363 bgcolor=#C2FFFF
| 390363 ||  || — || October 2, 2008 || Mount Lemmon || Mount Lemmon Survey || L4 || align=right | 8.5 km || 
|-id=364 bgcolor=#d6d6d6
| 390364 ||  || — || September 12, 2004 || Kitt Peak || Spacewatch || — || align=right | 3.1 km || 
|-id=365 bgcolor=#d6d6d6
| 390365 ||  || — || May 3, 2008 || Mount Lemmon || Mount Lemmon Survey || SYL7:4 || align=right | 6.6 km || 
|-id=366 bgcolor=#fefefe
| 390366 ||  || — || March 10, 2003 || Kitt Peak || Spacewatch || — || align=right data-sort-value="0.80" | 800 m || 
|-id=367 bgcolor=#d6d6d6
| 390367 ||  || — || April 25, 2007 || Kitt Peak || Spacewatch || — || align=right | 4.5 km || 
|-id=368 bgcolor=#fefefe
| 390368 ||  || — || March 26, 2009 || Mount Lemmon || Mount Lemmon Survey || — || align=right data-sort-value="0.85" | 850 m || 
|-id=369 bgcolor=#E9E9E9
| 390369 ||  || — || February 29, 2008 || Catalina || CSS || HNS || align=right | 1.5 km || 
|-id=370 bgcolor=#fefefe
| 390370 ||  || — || October 16, 2006 || Catalina || CSS || — || align=right data-sort-value="0.84" | 840 m || 
|-id=371 bgcolor=#E9E9E9
| 390371 ||  || — || October 22, 2009 || Mount Lemmon || Mount Lemmon Survey || EUN || align=right | 1.6 km || 
|-id=372 bgcolor=#E9E9E9
| 390372 ||  || — || April 25, 2007 || Mount Lemmon || Mount Lemmon Survey || — || align=right | 2.2 km || 
|-id=373 bgcolor=#E9E9E9
| 390373 ||  || — || November 11, 2006 || Kitt Peak || Spacewatch || MAR || align=right | 1.7 km || 
|-id=374 bgcolor=#E9E9E9
| 390374 ||  || — || April 21, 2006 || Catalina || CSS || — || align=right | 3.5 km || 
|-id=375 bgcolor=#E9E9E9
| 390375 ||  || — || July 30, 2008 || Kitt Peak || Spacewatch || — || align=right | 2.0 km || 
|-id=376 bgcolor=#E9E9E9
| 390376 ||  || — || February 25, 2007 || Mount Lemmon || Mount Lemmon Survey || — || align=right | 1.9 km || 
|-id=377 bgcolor=#E9E9E9
| 390377 ||  || — || October 7, 2004 || Kitt Peak || Spacewatch || MRX || align=right | 1.6 km || 
|-id=378 bgcolor=#d6d6d6
| 390378 ||  || — || March 13, 2011 || Mount Lemmon || Mount Lemmon Survey || — || align=right | 3.4 km || 
|-id=379 bgcolor=#E9E9E9
| 390379 ||  || — || November 6, 2005 || Mount Lemmon || Mount Lemmon Survey || — || align=right | 1.0 km || 
|-id=380 bgcolor=#d6d6d6
| 390380 ||  || — || December 1, 2008 || Socorro || LINEAR || — || align=right | 3.0 km || 
|-id=381 bgcolor=#E9E9E9
| 390381 ||  || — || December 30, 2000 || Socorro || LINEAR || — || align=right | 1.8 km || 
|-id=382 bgcolor=#E9E9E9
| 390382 ||  || — || September 24, 1960 || Palomar || PLS || — || align=right | 1.1 km || 
|-id=383 bgcolor=#d6d6d6
| 390383 ||  || — || September 26, 1995 || Kitt Peak || Spacewatch || — || align=right | 3.4 km || 
|-id=384 bgcolor=#E9E9E9
| 390384 ||  || — || December 10, 2004 || Socorro || LINEAR || GEF || align=right | 1.9 km || 
|-id=385 bgcolor=#E9E9E9
| 390385 ||  || — || February 8, 2006 || Kitt Peak || Spacewatch || — || align=right | 1.7 km || 
|-id=386 bgcolor=#E9E9E9
| 390386 ||  || — || August 27, 2009 || Kitt Peak || Spacewatch || HNS || align=right | 1.9 km || 
|-id=387 bgcolor=#E9E9E9
| 390387 ||  || — || June 6, 2002 || Socorro || LINEAR || — || align=right | 2.4 km || 
|-id=388 bgcolor=#d6d6d6
| 390388 ||  || — || December 2, 2008 || Kitt Peak || Spacewatch || HYG || align=right | 3.0 km || 
|-id=389 bgcolor=#d6d6d6
| 390389 ||  || — || January 2, 2003 || Socorro || LINEAR || EUP || align=right | 5.8 km || 
|-id=390 bgcolor=#d6d6d6
| 390390 ||  || — || October 8, 2007 || Catalina || CSS || — || align=right | 5.6 km || 
|-id=391 bgcolor=#d6d6d6
| 390391 ||  || — || September 7, 1996 || Kitt Peak || Spacewatch || — || align=right | 3.0 km || 
|-id=392 bgcolor=#d6d6d6
| 390392 ||  || — || December 5, 2002 || Socorro || LINEAR || EOS || align=right | 2.8 km || 
|-id=393 bgcolor=#E9E9E9
| 390393 ||  || — || September 30, 2008 || Catalina || CSS || ADE || align=right | 3.1 km || 
|-id=394 bgcolor=#E9E9E9
| 390394 ||  || — || September 12, 2004 || Kitt Peak || Spacewatch || — || align=right | 1.7 km || 
|-id=395 bgcolor=#E9E9E9
| 390395 ||  || — || September 12, 2004 || Socorro || LINEAR || HNS || align=right | 1.7 km || 
|-id=396 bgcolor=#E9E9E9
| 390396 ||  || — || September 24, 2008 || Mount Lemmon || Mount Lemmon Survey || KON || align=right | 3.2 km || 
|-id=397 bgcolor=#E9E9E9
| 390397 ||  || — || October 7, 2008 || Mount Lemmon || Mount Lemmon Survey || EUN || align=right | 1.3 km || 
|-id=398 bgcolor=#d6d6d6
| 390398 ||  || — || September 15, 2007 || Catalina || CSS || EUP || align=right | 4.1 km || 
|-id=399 bgcolor=#E9E9E9
| 390399 ||  || — || December 2, 2008 || Kitt Peak || Spacewatch || — || align=right | 3.8 km || 
|-id=400 bgcolor=#E9E9E9
| 390400 ||  || — || February 10, 2002 || Socorro || LINEAR || — || align=right data-sort-value="0.96" | 960 m || 
|}

390401–390500 

|-bgcolor=#E9E9E9
| 390401 ||  || — || January 25, 2006 || Catalina || CSS || — || align=right | 2.6 km || 
|-id=402 bgcolor=#d6d6d6
| 390402 ||  || — || December 3, 2008 || Mount Lemmon || Mount Lemmon Survey || EOS || align=right | 2.2 km || 
|-id=403 bgcolor=#d6d6d6
| 390403 ||  || — || November 13, 2007 || Mount Lemmon || Mount Lemmon Survey || — || align=right | 3.5 km || 
|-id=404 bgcolor=#fefefe
| 390404 ||  || — || September 14, 2006 || Kitt Peak || Spacewatch || — || align=right data-sort-value="0.73" | 730 m || 
|-id=405 bgcolor=#E9E9E9
| 390405 ||  || — || December 10, 2004 || Kitt Peak || Spacewatch || — || align=right | 3.0 km || 
|-id=406 bgcolor=#E9E9E9
| 390406 ||  || — || January 23, 2006 || Kitt Peak || Spacewatch || — || align=right | 1.1 km || 
|-id=407 bgcolor=#FA8072
| 390407 ||  || — || July 27, 2005 || Siding Spring || SSS || H || align=right data-sort-value="0.85" | 850 m || 
|-id=408 bgcolor=#E9E9E9
| 390408 ||  || — || December 7, 2008 || Mount Lemmon || Mount Lemmon Survey || GEF || align=right | 1.1 km || 
|-id=409 bgcolor=#E9E9E9
| 390409 ||  || — || May 21, 2011 || Mount Lemmon || Mount Lemmon Survey || — || align=right | 1.7 km || 
|-id=410 bgcolor=#d6d6d6
| 390410 ||  || — || October 10, 2007 || Catalina || CSS || EOS || align=right | 2.1 km || 
|-id=411 bgcolor=#d6d6d6
| 390411 ||  || — || August 23, 2007 || Siding Spring || SSS || — || align=right | 4.6 km || 
|-id=412 bgcolor=#d6d6d6
| 390412 ||  || — || December 30, 2007 || Mount Lemmon || Mount Lemmon Survey || — || align=right | 6.6 km || 
|-id=413 bgcolor=#E9E9E9
| 390413 ||  || — || February 1, 2006 || Catalina || CSS || — || align=right | 3.5 km || 
|-id=414 bgcolor=#d6d6d6
| 390414 ||  || — || September 20, 2006 || Kitt Peak || Spacewatch || — || align=right | 3.6 km || 
|-id=415 bgcolor=#d6d6d6
| 390415 ||  || — || March 16, 2009 || Catalina || CSS || — || align=right | 4.2 km || 
|-id=416 bgcolor=#E9E9E9
| 390416 ||  || — || May 7, 2007 || Mount Lemmon || Mount Lemmon Survey || MAR || align=right | 1.3 km || 
|-id=417 bgcolor=#d6d6d6
| 390417 ||  || — || June 28, 2011 || Mount Lemmon || Mount Lemmon Survey || — || align=right | 3.1 km || 
|-id=418 bgcolor=#fefefe
| 390418 ||  || — || April 7, 2003 || Kitt Peak || Spacewatch || — || align=right | 1.0 km || 
|-id=419 bgcolor=#E9E9E9
| 390419 ||  || — || February 14, 2005 || Catalina || CSS || — || align=right | 4.4 km || 
|-id=420 bgcolor=#d6d6d6
| 390420 ||  || — || November 5, 2007 || XuYi || PMO NEO || — || align=right | 3.0 km || 
|-id=421 bgcolor=#d6d6d6
| 390421 ||  || — || June 17, 2005 || Mount Lemmon || Mount Lemmon Survey || — || align=right | 4.3 km || 
|-id=422 bgcolor=#E9E9E9
| 390422 ||  || — || February 1, 2006 || Mount Lemmon || Mount Lemmon Survey || — || align=right data-sort-value="0.94" | 940 m || 
|-id=423 bgcolor=#E9E9E9
| 390423 ||  || — || January 30, 2006 || Catalina || CSS || — || align=right | 2.9 km || 
|-id=424 bgcolor=#fefefe
| 390424 ||  || — || November 21, 2006 || Catalina || CSS || FLO || align=right data-sort-value="0.72" | 720 m || 
|-id=425 bgcolor=#E9E9E9
| 390425 ||  || — || June 15, 2007 || Kitt Peak || Spacewatch || — || align=right | 1.9 km || 
|-id=426 bgcolor=#d6d6d6
| 390426 ||  || — || March 30, 2004 || Kitt Peak || Spacewatch || — || align=right | 4.0 km || 
|-id=427 bgcolor=#E9E9E9
| 390427 ||  || — || March 3, 2006 || Catalina || CSS || BAR || align=right | 1.5 km || 
|-id=428 bgcolor=#E9E9E9
| 390428 ||  || — || October 28, 2008 || Mount Lemmon || Mount Lemmon Survey || — || align=right | 2.7 km || 
|-id=429 bgcolor=#fefefe
| 390429 ||  || — || September 30, 2005 || Kitt Peak || Spacewatch || MAS || align=right data-sort-value="0.69" | 690 m || 
|-id=430 bgcolor=#d6d6d6
| 390430 ||  || — || December 6, 2008 || Kitt Peak || Spacewatch || — || align=right | 3.1 km || 
|-id=431 bgcolor=#E9E9E9
| 390431 ||  || — || December 1, 2008 || Kitt Peak || Spacewatch || — || align=right | 3.0 km || 
|-id=432 bgcolor=#fefefe
| 390432 ||  || — || December 19, 2003 || Kitt Peak || Spacewatch || — || align=right data-sort-value="0.82" | 820 m || 
|-id=433 bgcolor=#E9E9E9
| 390433 ||  || — || June 12, 2011 || Mount Lemmon || Mount Lemmon Survey || RAF || align=right | 1.3 km || 
|-id=434 bgcolor=#d6d6d6
| 390434 ||  || — || January 20, 2009 || Catalina || CSS || — || align=right | 4.2 km || 
|-id=435 bgcolor=#fefefe
| 390435 ||  || — || April 21, 2004 || Campo Imperatore || CINEOS || — || align=right data-sort-value="0.89" | 890 m || 
|-id=436 bgcolor=#E9E9E9
| 390436 ||  || — || December 4, 2000 || Socorro || LINEAR || — || align=right | 1.5 km || 
|-id=437 bgcolor=#E9E9E9
| 390437 ||  || — || September 4, 2008 || Kitt Peak || Spacewatch || — || align=right | 1.7 km || 
|-id=438 bgcolor=#E9E9E9
| 390438 ||  || — || December 18, 2000 || Kitt Peak || Spacewatch || — || align=right | 1.9 km || 
|-id=439 bgcolor=#d6d6d6
| 390439 ||  || — || March 6, 2010 || WISE || WISE || — || align=right | 4.9 km || 
|-id=440 bgcolor=#d6d6d6
| 390440 ||  || — || December 31, 2007 || Kitt Peak || Spacewatch || HYG || align=right | 2.8 km || 
|-id=441 bgcolor=#E9E9E9
| 390441 ||  || — || November 21, 2003 || Kitt Peak || Spacewatch || HOF || align=right | 2.7 km || 
|-id=442 bgcolor=#E9E9E9
| 390442 ||  || — || October 7, 2007 || Mount Lemmon || Mount Lemmon Survey || MRX || align=right | 1.2 km || 
|-id=443 bgcolor=#E9E9E9
| 390443 ||  || — || September 21, 2008 || Mount Lemmon || Mount Lemmon Survey || EUN || align=right | 1.4 km || 
|-id=444 bgcolor=#E9E9E9
| 390444 ||  || — || January 20, 2010 || WISE || WISE || — || align=right | 2.9 km || 
|-id=445 bgcolor=#fefefe
| 390445 ||  || — || March 3, 2000 || Socorro || LINEAR || — || align=right data-sort-value="0.70" | 700 m || 
|-id=446 bgcolor=#E9E9E9
| 390446 ||  || — || November 16, 2000 || Kitt Peak || Spacewatch || — || align=right | 1.1 km || 
|-id=447 bgcolor=#E9E9E9
| 390447 ||  || — || December 18, 2004 || Mount Lemmon || Mount Lemmon Survey || — || align=right | 3.0 km || 
|-id=448 bgcolor=#d6d6d6
| 390448 ||  || — || January 30, 2003 || Socorro || LINEAR || — || align=right | 3.4 km || 
|-id=449 bgcolor=#fefefe
| 390449 ||  || — || May 7, 2008 || Mount Lemmon || Mount Lemmon Survey || FLO || align=right data-sort-value="0.84" | 840 m || 
|-id=450 bgcolor=#d6d6d6
| 390450 ||  || — || March 15, 2004 || Kitt Peak || Spacewatch || EOS || align=right | 1.5 km || 
|-id=451 bgcolor=#fefefe
| 390451 ||  || — || March 27, 2004 || Socorro || LINEAR || FLO || align=right data-sort-value="0.59" | 590 m || 
|-id=452 bgcolor=#fefefe
| 390452 ||  || — || November 23, 2006 || Kitt Peak || Spacewatch || — || align=right data-sort-value="0.78" | 780 m || 
|-id=453 bgcolor=#E9E9E9
| 390453 ||  || — || September 21, 2008 || Mount Lemmon || Mount Lemmon Survey || — || align=right | 2.4 km || 
|-id=454 bgcolor=#E9E9E9
| 390454 ||  || — || January 28, 2006 || Mount Lemmon || Mount Lemmon Survey || — || align=right data-sort-value="0.78" | 780 m || 
|-id=455 bgcolor=#E9E9E9
| 390455 ||  || — || October 13, 2004 || Anderson Mesa || LONEOS || MAR || align=right | 1.5 km || 
|-id=456 bgcolor=#d6d6d6
| 390456 ||  || — || December 29, 2008 || Kitt Peak || Spacewatch || — || align=right | 2.6 km || 
|-id=457 bgcolor=#E9E9E9
| 390457 ||  || — || September 23, 2004 || Kitt Peak || Spacewatch || — || align=right | 1.2 km || 
|-id=458 bgcolor=#E9E9E9
| 390458 ||  || — || March 16, 2005 || Mount Lemmon || Mount Lemmon Survey || — || align=right | 1.8 km || 
|-id=459 bgcolor=#E9E9E9
| 390459 ||  || — || November 18, 2008 || Kitt Peak || Spacewatch || HOF || align=right | 2.8 km || 
|-id=460 bgcolor=#E9E9E9
| 390460 ||  || — || October 4, 2004 || Kitt Peak || Spacewatch || — || align=right data-sort-value="0.98" | 980 m || 
|-id=461 bgcolor=#fefefe
| 390461 ||  || — || March 29, 2008 || Kitt Peak || Spacewatch || — || align=right data-sort-value="0.76" | 760 m || 
|-id=462 bgcolor=#fefefe
| 390462 ||  || — || November 17, 2009 || Kitt Peak || Spacewatch || NYS || align=right data-sort-value="0.70" | 700 m || 
|-id=463 bgcolor=#E9E9E9
| 390463 ||  || — || February 19, 2010 || Kitt Peak || Spacewatch || — || align=right | 2.0 km || 
|-id=464 bgcolor=#E9E9E9
| 390464 ||  || — || September 21, 2003 || Kitt Peak || Spacewatch || — || align=right | 2.2 km || 
|-id=465 bgcolor=#fefefe
| 390465 ||  || — || January 27, 2007 || Mount Lemmon || Mount Lemmon Survey || NYS || align=right data-sort-value="0.56" | 560 m || 
|-id=466 bgcolor=#d6d6d6
| 390466 ||  || — || December 29, 2008 || Mount Lemmon || Mount Lemmon Survey || — || align=right | 3.1 km || 
|-id=467 bgcolor=#E9E9E9
| 390467 ||  || — || February 2, 2005 || Kitt Peak || Spacewatch || WIT || align=right | 1.0 km || 
|-id=468 bgcolor=#E9E9E9
| 390468 ||  || — || October 1, 2005 || Mount Lemmon || Mount Lemmon Survey || — || align=right | 3.8 km || 
|-id=469 bgcolor=#d6d6d6
| 390469 ||  || — || November 23, 1998 || Kitt Peak || Spacewatch || — || align=right | 2.4 km || 
|-id=470 bgcolor=#d6d6d6
| 390470 ||  || — || January 25, 2009 || Catalina || CSS || — || align=right | 4.2 km || 
|-id=471 bgcolor=#E9E9E9
| 390471 ||  || — || November 30, 2003 || Kitt Peak || Spacewatch || HOF || align=right | 3.1 km || 
|-id=472 bgcolor=#fefefe
| 390472 ||  || — || January 4, 2003 || Socorro || LINEAR || — || align=right data-sort-value="0.87" | 870 m || 
|-id=473 bgcolor=#d6d6d6
| 390473 ||  || — || January 16, 2009 || Kitt Peak || Spacewatch || — || align=right | 2.6 km || 
|-id=474 bgcolor=#E9E9E9
| 390474 ||  || — || September 26, 2008 || Kitt Peak || Spacewatch || — || align=right | 1.0 km || 
|-id=475 bgcolor=#d6d6d6
| 390475 ||  || — || December 30, 2007 || Mount Lemmon || Mount Lemmon Survey || 7:4 || align=right | 4.3 km || 
|-id=476 bgcolor=#d6d6d6
| 390476 ||  || — || January 15, 2010 || WISE || WISE || NAE || align=right | 2.9 km || 
|-id=477 bgcolor=#E9E9E9
| 390477 ||  || — || January 7, 2010 || Kitt Peak || Spacewatch || — || align=right | 1.6 km || 
|-id=478 bgcolor=#E9E9E9
| 390478 ||  || — || January 31, 2006 || Kitt Peak || Spacewatch || — || align=right | 1.2 km || 
|-id=479 bgcolor=#E9E9E9
| 390479 ||  || — || January 17, 1997 || Kitt Peak || Spacewatch || — || align=right | 2.0 km || 
|-id=480 bgcolor=#E9E9E9
| 390480 ||  || — || December 3, 2004 || Catalina || CSS || INO || align=right | 2.1 km || 
|-id=481 bgcolor=#E9E9E9
| 390481 ||  || — || November 3, 2004 || Anderson Mesa || LONEOS || — || align=right | 2.2 km || 
|-id=482 bgcolor=#E9E9E9
| 390482 ||  || — || July 19, 2004 || Siding Spring || SSS || — || align=right | 1.5 km || 
|-id=483 bgcolor=#d6d6d6
| 390483 ||  || — || February 20, 2009 || Kitt Peak || Spacewatch || THM || align=right | 2.3 km || 
|-id=484 bgcolor=#fefefe
| 390484 ||  || — || September 18, 2009 || Mount Lemmon || Mount Lemmon Survey || — || align=right data-sort-value="0.78" | 780 m || 
|-id=485 bgcolor=#E9E9E9
| 390485 ||  || — || October 6, 2008 || Mount Lemmon || Mount Lemmon Survey || — || align=right | 1.4 km || 
|-id=486 bgcolor=#fefefe
| 390486 ||  || — || May 14, 2008 || Mount Lemmon || Mount Lemmon Survey || — || align=right | 1.2 km || 
|-id=487 bgcolor=#d6d6d6
| 390487 ||  || — || May 14, 2004 || Kitt Peak || Spacewatch || — || align=right | 2.8 km || 
|-id=488 bgcolor=#fefefe
| 390488 ||  || — || September 23, 2009 || Kitt Peak || Spacewatch || FLO || align=right data-sort-value="0.67" | 670 m || 
|-id=489 bgcolor=#d6d6d6
| 390489 ||  || — || November 8, 2007 || Mount Lemmon || Mount Lemmon Survey || — || align=right | 4.5 km || 
|-id=490 bgcolor=#E9E9E9
| 390490 ||  || — || January 13, 2005 || Kitt Peak || Spacewatch || WIT || align=right | 1.4 km || 
|-id=491 bgcolor=#E9E9E9
| 390491 ||  || — || October 14, 2004 || Kitt Peak || Spacewatch || — || align=right | 1.2 km || 
|-id=492 bgcolor=#E9E9E9
| 390492 ||  || — || September 11, 2004 || Socorro || LINEAR || EUN || align=right | 1.2 km || 
|-id=493 bgcolor=#E9E9E9
| 390493 ||  || — || September 1, 1994 || Kitt Peak || Spacewatch || — || align=right | 2.7 km || 
|-id=494 bgcolor=#E9E9E9
| 390494 ||  || — || February 1, 2006 || Catalina || CSS || EUN || align=right | 1.6 km || 
|-id=495 bgcolor=#d6d6d6
| 390495 ||  || — || January 25, 1998 || Kitt Peak || Spacewatch || — || align=right | 3.6 km || 
|-id=496 bgcolor=#E9E9E9
| 390496 ||  || — || February 3, 2006 || Mount Lemmon || Mount Lemmon Survey || — || align=right | 3.4 km || 
|-id=497 bgcolor=#d6d6d6
| 390497 ||  || — || March 9, 2005 || Mount Lemmon || Mount Lemmon Survey || KOR || align=right | 1.5 km || 
|-id=498 bgcolor=#E9E9E9
| 390498 ||  || — || January 6, 2000 || Kitt Peak || Spacewatch || HOF || align=right | 3.1 km || 
|-id=499 bgcolor=#E9E9E9
| 390499 ||  || — || February 25, 2006 || Mount Lemmon || Mount Lemmon Survey || — || align=right data-sort-value="0.66" | 660 m || 
|-id=500 bgcolor=#fefefe
| 390500 ||  || — || March 16, 2004 || Socorro || LINEAR || V || align=right data-sort-value="0.78" | 780 m || 
|}

390501–390600 

|-bgcolor=#d6d6d6
| 390501 ||  || — || February 19, 2009 || Kitt Peak || Spacewatch || — || align=right | 2.9 km || 
|-id=502 bgcolor=#d6d6d6
| 390502 ||  || — || January 3, 2009 || Mount Lemmon || Mount Lemmon Survey || — || align=right | 2.5 km || 
|-id=503 bgcolor=#E9E9E9
| 390503 ||  || — || January 26, 2006 || Mount Lemmon || Mount Lemmon Survey || — || align=right | 1.6 km || 
|-id=504 bgcolor=#d6d6d6
| 390504 ||  || — || February 1, 2009 || Catalina || CSS || — || align=right | 3.7 km || 
|-id=505 bgcolor=#d6d6d6
| 390505 ||  || — || February 19, 2009 || Kitt Peak || Spacewatch || — || align=right | 1.9 km || 
|-id=506 bgcolor=#E9E9E9
| 390506 ||  || — || April 20, 1998 || Kitt Peak || Spacewatch || MAR || align=right | 1.5 km || 
|-id=507 bgcolor=#d6d6d6
| 390507 ||  || — || September 19, 2001 || Socorro || LINEAR || — || align=right | 3.1 km || 
|-id=508 bgcolor=#fefefe
| 390508 ||  || — || June 9, 2004 || Socorro || LINEAR || H || align=right data-sort-value="0.90" | 900 m || 
|-id=509 bgcolor=#fefefe
| 390509 ||  || — || April 25, 2003 || Anderson Mesa || LONEOS || — || align=right | 2.7 km || 
|-id=510 bgcolor=#E9E9E9
| 390510 ||  || — || April 2, 2006 || Kitt Peak || Spacewatch || — || align=right | 2.2 km || 
|-id=511 bgcolor=#E9E9E9
| 390511 ||  || — || September 12, 2004 || Socorro || LINEAR || — || align=right | 1.1 km || 
|-id=512 bgcolor=#E9E9E9
| 390512 ||  || — || October 1, 2003 || Anderson Mesa || LONEOS || — || align=right | 3.2 km || 
|-id=513 bgcolor=#E9E9E9
| 390513 ||  || — || April 8, 2006 || Kitt Peak || Spacewatch || EUN || align=right | 1.3 km || 
|-id=514 bgcolor=#E9E9E9
| 390514 ||  || — || October 16, 1977 || Palomar || PLS || — || align=right | 1.3 km || 
|-id=515 bgcolor=#E9E9E9
| 390515 ||  || — || October 4, 1994 || Kitt Peak || Spacewatch || — || align=right | 2.2 km || 
|-id=516 bgcolor=#E9E9E9
| 390516 ||  || — || September 17, 1995 || Kitt Peak || Spacewatch || MAR || align=right | 1.1 km || 
|-id=517 bgcolor=#E9E9E9
| 390517 ||  || — || September 17, 1995 || Kitt Peak || Spacewatch || ADE || align=right | 1.9 km || 
|-id=518 bgcolor=#fefefe
| 390518 ||  || — || September 25, 1995 || Kitt Peak || Spacewatch || — || align=right data-sort-value="0.61" | 610 m || 
|-id=519 bgcolor=#E9E9E9
| 390519 ||  || — || October 15, 1995 || Kitt Peak || Spacewatch || — || align=right data-sort-value="0.93" | 930 m || 
|-id=520 bgcolor=#fefefe
| 390520 ||  || — || October 19, 1995 || Kitt Peak || Spacewatch || — || align=right data-sort-value="0.69" | 690 m || 
|-id=521 bgcolor=#FA8072
| 390521 ||  || — || December 26, 1995 || Kitt Peak || Spacewatch || — || align=right data-sort-value="0.54" | 540 m || 
|-id=522 bgcolor=#FFC2E0
| 390522 ||  || — || April 15, 1996 || Kitt Peak || Spacewatch || APO || align=right data-sort-value="0.28" | 280 m || 
|-id=523 bgcolor=#d6d6d6
| 390523 ||  || — || October 6, 1996 || Kitt Peak || Spacewatch || — || align=right | 3.3 km || 
|-id=524 bgcolor=#fefefe
| 390524 ||  || — || October 7, 1996 || Kitt Peak || Spacewatch || — || align=right data-sort-value="0.96" | 960 m || 
|-id=525 bgcolor=#E9E9E9
| 390525 ||  || — || November 10, 1996 || Kitt Peak || Spacewatch || — || align=right data-sort-value="0.98" | 980 m || 
|-id=526 bgcolor=#fefefe
| 390526 ||  || — || December 12, 1996 || Oohira || T. Urata || — || align=right | 2.5 km || 
|-id=527 bgcolor=#E9E9E9
| 390527 ||  || — || March 4, 1997 || Kitt Peak || Spacewatch || — || align=right | 1.4 km || 
|-id=528 bgcolor=#C2FFFF
| 390528 ||  || — || September 27, 1997 || Kitt Peak || Spacewatch || L4 || align=right | 7.3 km || 
|-id=529 bgcolor=#fefefe
| 390529 ||  || — || September 28, 1997 || Kitt Peak || Spacewatch || MAS || align=right data-sort-value="0.64" | 640 m || 
|-id=530 bgcolor=#d6d6d6
| 390530 ||  || — || March 2, 1998 || Xinglong || SCAP || — || align=right | 2.8 km || 
|-id=531 bgcolor=#d6d6d6
| 390531 ||  || — || April 24, 1998 || Mauna Kea || C. Veillet || — || align=right | 2.7 km || 
|-id=532 bgcolor=#E9E9E9
| 390532 ||  || — || August 26, 1998 || La Silla || E. W. Elst || — || align=right | 2.7 km || 
|-id=533 bgcolor=#E9E9E9
| 390533 ||  || — || September 15, 1998 || Caussols || ODAS || CLO || align=right | 2.0 km || 
|-id=534 bgcolor=#fefefe
| 390534 ||  || — || October 13, 1998 || San Marcello || L. Tesi || — || align=right data-sort-value="0.85" | 850 m || 
|-id=535 bgcolor=#fefefe
| 390535 ||  || — || February 10, 1999 || Socorro || LINEAR || — || align=right data-sort-value="0.99" | 990 m || 
|-id=536 bgcolor=#FFC2E0
| 390536 ||  || — || May 17, 1999 || Socorro || LINEAR || AMO || align=right data-sort-value="0.76" | 760 m || 
|-id=537 bgcolor=#E9E9E9
| 390537 ||  || — || September 8, 1999 || Socorro || LINEAR || — || align=right | 2.2 km || 
|-id=538 bgcolor=#E9E9E9
| 390538 ||  || — || September 10, 1999 || Socorro || LINEAR || — || align=right | 1.5 km || 
|-id=539 bgcolor=#fefefe
| 390539 ||  || — || October 6, 1999 || Kitt Peak || Spacewatch || — || align=right data-sort-value="0.78" | 780 m || 
|-id=540 bgcolor=#FA8072
| 390540 ||  || — || October 10, 1999 || Socorro || LINEAR || — || align=right data-sort-value="0.79" | 790 m || 
|-id=541 bgcolor=#E9E9E9
| 390541 ||  || — || October 15, 1999 || Socorro || LINEAR || — || align=right | 1.3 km || 
|-id=542 bgcolor=#E9E9E9
| 390542 ||  || — || November 9, 1999 || Socorro || LINEAR || JUN || align=right | 1.5 km || 
|-id=543 bgcolor=#fefefe
| 390543 ||  || — || December 16, 1999 || Kitt Peak || Spacewatch || — || align=right data-sort-value="0.87" | 870 m || 
|-id=544 bgcolor=#E9E9E9
| 390544 ||  || — || February 8, 2000 || Socorro || LINEAR || — || align=right | 2.1 km || 
|-id=545 bgcolor=#E9E9E9
| 390545 ||  || — || February 3, 2000 || Socorro || LINEAR || — || align=right | 2.7 km || 
|-id=546 bgcolor=#FA8072
| 390546 ||  || — || March 10, 2000 || Catalina || CSS || — || align=right data-sort-value="0.83" | 830 m || 
|-id=547 bgcolor=#fefefe
| 390547 ||  || — || March 10, 2000 || Kitt Peak || Spacewatch || — || align=right data-sort-value="0.56" | 560 m || 
|-id=548 bgcolor=#fefefe
| 390548 ||  || — || March 25, 2000 || Kitt Peak || Spacewatch || NYS || align=right data-sort-value="0.76" | 760 m || 
|-id=549 bgcolor=#fefefe
| 390549 ||  || — || March 25, 2000 || Kitt Peak || Spacewatch || — || align=right data-sort-value="0.66" | 660 m || 
|-id=550 bgcolor=#fefefe
| 390550 ||  || — || May 3, 2000 || Socorro || LINEAR || — || align=right data-sort-value="0.68" | 680 m || 
|-id=551 bgcolor=#fefefe
| 390551 ||  || — || May 9, 2000 || Kitt Peak || Spacewatch || NYS || align=right data-sort-value="0.49" | 490 m || 
|-id=552 bgcolor=#fefefe
| 390552 ||  || — || September 23, 2000 || Socorro || LINEAR || — || align=right | 1.0 km || 
|-id=553 bgcolor=#FA8072
| 390553 ||  || — || September 25, 2000 || Socorro || LINEAR || — || align=right | 1.1 km || 
|-id=554 bgcolor=#E9E9E9
| 390554 ||  || — || September 24, 2000 || Socorro || LINEAR || — || align=right | 1.1 km || 
|-id=555 bgcolor=#fefefe
| 390555 ||  || — || September 28, 2000 || Socorro || LINEAR || — || align=right | 1.1 km || 
|-id=556 bgcolor=#d6d6d6
| 390556 ||  || — || October 1, 2000 || Socorro || LINEAR || VER || align=right | 2.6 km || 
|-id=557 bgcolor=#fefefe
| 390557 ||  || — || October 24, 2000 || Emerald Lane || L. Ball || MAS || align=right data-sort-value="0.88" | 880 m || 
|-id=558 bgcolor=#d6d6d6
| 390558 ||  || — || November 1, 2000 || Kitt Peak || Spacewatch || — || align=right | 2.9 km || 
|-id=559 bgcolor=#E9E9E9
| 390559 ||  || — || November 20, 2000 || Socorro || LINEAR || — || align=right | 1.4 km || 
|-id=560 bgcolor=#E9E9E9
| 390560 ||  || — || December 30, 2000 || Socorro || LINEAR || — || align=right | 1.6 km || 
|-id=561 bgcolor=#FA8072
| 390561 ||  || — || January 5, 2001 || Socorro || LINEAR || H || align=right data-sort-value="0.89" | 890 m || 
|-id=562 bgcolor=#E9E9E9
| 390562 ||  || — || January 21, 2001 || Socorro || LINEAR || — || align=right | 1.9 km || 
|-id=563 bgcolor=#E9E9E9
| 390563 ||  || — || February 15, 2001 || Socorro || LINEAR || HNS || align=right | 1.4 km || 
|-id=564 bgcolor=#fefefe
| 390564 ||  || — || February 1, 2001 || Kitt Peak || Spacewatch || — || align=right data-sort-value="0.71" | 710 m || 
|-id=565 bgcolor=#E9E9E9
| 390565 ||  || — || January 26, 2001 || Kitt Peak || Spacewatch || MAR || align=right | 1.3 km || 
|-id=566 bgcolor=#E9E9E9
| 390566 ||  || — || February 19, 2001 || Socorro || LINEAR || — || align=right | 1.6 km || 
|-id=567 bgcolor=#fefefe
| 390567 ||  || — || March 20, 2001 || Haleakala || NEAT || H || align=right data-sort-value="0.93" | 930 m || 
|-id=568 bgcolor=#E9E9E9
| 390568 ||  || — || March 16, 2001 || Socorro || LINEAR || RAF || align=right | 1.3 km || 
|-id=569 bgcolor=#E9E9E9
| 390569 ||  || — || March 16, 2001 || Socorro || LINEAR || — || align=right | 1.7 km || 
|-id=570 bgcolor=#fefefe
| 390570 ||  || — || March 19, 2001 || Anderson Mesa || LONEOS || H || align=right data-sort-value="0.73" | 730 m || 
|-id=571 bgcolor=#fefefe
| 390571 ||  || — || April 17, 2001 || Socorro || LINEAR || — || align=right data-sort-value="0.68" | 680 m || 
|-id=572 bgcolor=#FA8072
| 390572 ||  || — || April 23, 2001 || Socorro || LINEAR || — || align=right data-sort-value="0.74" | 740 m || 
|-id=573 bgcolor=#fefefe
| 390573 ||  || — || April 25, 2001 || Anderson Mesa || LONEOS || H || align=right data-sort-value="0.73" | 730 m || 
|-id=574 bgcolor=#E9E9E9
| 390574 ||  || — || May 17, 2001 || Socorro || LINEAR || — || align=right | 2.0 km || 
|-id=575 bgcolor=#fefefe
| 390575 ||  || — || June 25, 2001 || Palomar || NEAT || FLO || align=right data-sort-value="0.72" | 720 m || 
|-id=576 bgcolor=#fefefe
| 390576 ||  || — || July 23, 2001 || Haleakala || NEAT || — || align=right data-sort-value="0.78" | 780 m || 
|-id=577 bgcolor=#E9E9E9
| 390577 ||  || — || July 27, 2001 || Palomar || NEAT || — || align=right | 2.4 km || 
|-id=578 bgcolor=#FA8072
| 390578 ||  || — || August 9, 2001 || Palomar || NEAT || — || align=right data-sort-value="0.75" | 750 m || 
|-id=579 bgcolor=#fefefe
| 390579 ||  || — || August 13, 2001 || Haleakala || NEAT || V || align=right data-sort-value="0.78" | 780 m || 
|-id=580 bgcolor=#fefefe
| 390580 ||  || — || August 16, 2001 || Socorro || LINEAR || — || align=right data-sort-value="0.98" | 980 m || 
|-id=581 bgcolor=#fefefe
| 390581 ||  || — || August 17, 2001 || Socorro || LINEAR || V || align=right data-sort-value="0.98" | 980 m || 
|-id=582 bgcolor=#E9E9E9
| 390582 ||  || — || August 23, 2001 || Anderson Mesa || LONEOS || GEF || align=right | 1.6 km || 
|-id=583 bgcolor=#E9E9E9
| 390583 ||  || — || August 25, 2001 || Socorro || LINEAR || — || align=right | 2.4 km || 
|-id=584 bgcolor=#fefefe
| 390584 ||  || — || August 16, 2001 || Palomar || NEAT || — || align=right data-sort-value="0.88" | 880 m || 
|-id=585 bgcolor=#fefefe
| 390585 ||  || — || August 16, 2001 || Socorro || LINEAR || H || align=right data-sort-value="0.54" | 540 m || 
|-id=586 bgcolor=#fefefe
| 390586 ||  || — || September 7, 2001 || Socorro || LINEAR || NYS || align=right data-sort-value="0.70" | 700 m || 
|-id=587 bgcolor=#fefefe
| 390587 ||  || — || September 12, 2001 || Socorro || LINEAR || V || align=right data-sort-value="0.72" | 720 m || 
|-id=588 bgcolor=#E9E9E9
| 390588 ||  || — || September 10, 2001 || Socorro || LINEAR || — || align=right | 2.6 km || 
|-id=589 bgcolor=#d6d6d6
| 390589 ||  || — || September 12, 2001 || Socorro || LINEAR || — || align=right | 2.9 km || 
|-id=590 bgcolor=#fefefe
| 390590 ||  || — || September 17, 2001 || Desert Eagle || W. K. Y. Yeung || — || align=right data-sort-value="0.86" | 860 m || 
|-id=591 bgcolor=#fefefe
| 390591 ||  || — || September 16, 2001 || Socorro || LINEAR || FLO || align=right data-sort-value="0.92" | 920 m || 
|-id=592 bgcolor=#fefefe
| 390592 ||  || — || September 17, 2001 || Socorro || LINEAR || H || align=right data-sort-value="0.96" | 960 m || 
|-id=593 bgcolor=#fefefe
| 390593 ||  || — || July 25, 2001 || Kitt Peak || Spacewatch || FLO || align=right data-sort-value="0.64" | 640 m || 
|-id=594 bgcolor=#d6d6d6
| 390594 ||  || — || September 20, 2001 || Socorro || LINEAR || — || align=right | 2.6 km || 
|-id=595 bgcolor=#fefefe
| 390595 ||  || — || September 20, 2001 || Socorro || LINEAR || — || align=right data-sort-value="0.94" | 940 m || 
|-id=596 bgcolor=#fefefe
| 390596 ||  || — || September 19, 2001 || Socorro || LINEAR || V || align=right data-sort-value="0.56" | 560 m || 
|-id=597 bgcolor=#fefefe
| 390597 ||  || — || September 20, 2001 || Kitt Peak || Spacewatch || — || align=right data-sort-value="0.86" | 860 m || 
|-id=598 bgcolor=#fefefe
| 390598 ||  || — || September 20, 2001 || Socorro || LINEAR || V || align=right data-sort-value="0.82" | 820 m || 
|-id=599 bgcolor=#E9E9E9
| 390599 ||  || — || September 19, 2001 || Socorro || LINEAR || — || align=right | 1.3 km || 
|-id=600 bgcolor=#E9E9E9
| 390600 ||  || — || September 21, 2001 || Socorro || LINEAR || DOR || align=right | 3.3 km || 
|}

390601–390700 

|-bgcolor=#fefefe
| 390601 ||  || — || October 14, 2001 || Socorro || LINEAR || V || align=right data-sort-value="0.79" | 790 m || 
|-id=602 bgcolor=#fefefe
| 390602 ||  || — || October 14, 2001 || Socorro || LINEAR || — || align=right | 1.2 km || 
|-id=603 bgcolor=#fefefe
| 390603 ||  || — || October 14, 2001 || Socorro || LINEAR || — || align=right data-sort-value="0.93" | 930 m || 
|-id=604 bgcolor=#fefefe
| 390604 ||  || — || October 10, 2001 || Palomar || NEAT || — || align=right | 1.1 km || 
|-id=605 bgcolor=#d6d6d6
| 390605 ||  || — || October 14, 2001 || Socorro || LINEAR || — || align=right | 3.9 km || 
|-id=606 bgcolor=#fefefe
| 390606 ||  || — || October 15, 2001 || Socorro || LINEAR || NYS || align=right data-sort-value="0.67" | 670 m || 
|-id=607 bgcolor=#d6d6d6
| 390607 ||  || — || October 14, 2001 || Socorro || LINEAR || — || align=right | 3.3 km || 
|-id=608 bgcolor=#fefefe
| 390608 ||  || — || October 10, 2001 || Palomar || NEAT || — || align=right data-sort-value="0.89" | 890 m || 
|-id=609 bgcolor=#fefefe
| 390609 ||  || — || October 16, 2001 || Socorro || LINEAR || — || align=right | 1.1 km || 
|-id=610 bgcolor=#d6d6d6
| 390610 ||  || — || October 17, 2001 || Socorro || LINEAR || — || align=right | 3.2 km || 
|-id=611 bgcolor=#fefefe
| 390611 ||  || — || September 24, 2001 || Socorro || LINEAR || — || align=right | 1.3 km || 
|-id=612 bgcolor=#fefefe
| 390612 ||  || — || October 17, 2001 || Socorro || LINEAR || V || align=right data-sort-value="0.62" | 620 m || 
|-id=613 bgcolor=#d6d6d6
| 390613 ||  || — || October 10, 2001 || Kitt Peak || Spacewatch || — || align=right | 4.7 km || 
|-id=614 bgcolor=#fefefe
| 390614 ||  || — || October 23, 2001 || Socorro || LINEAR || — || align=right data-sort-value="0.82" | 820 m || 
|-id=615 bgcolor=#fefefe
| 390615 ||  || — || November 11, 2001 || Kitt Peak || Spacewatch || NYS || align=right data-sort-value="0.53" | 530 m || 
|-id=616 bgcolor=#d6d6d6
| 390616 ||  || — || November 9, 2001 || Socorro || LINEAR || INA || align=right | 3.4 km || 
|-id=617 bgcolor=#d6d6d6
| 390617 ||  || — || November 15, 2001 || Kitt Peak || Spacewatch || EOS || align=right | 2.1 km || 
|-id=618 bgcolor=#d6d6d6
| 390618 ||  || — || October 21, 2001 || Socorro || LINEAR || TIR || align=right | 3.1 km || 
|-id=619 bgcolor=#fefefe
| 390619 ||  || — || November 19, 2001 || Socorro || LINEAR || V || align=right data-sort-value="0.87" | 870 m || 
|-id=620 bgcolor=#fefefe
| 390620 ||  || — || November 12, 2001 || Kitt Peak || Spacewatch || — || align=right data-sort-value="0.89" | 890 m || 
|-id=621 bgcolor=#fefefe
| 390621 ||  || — || November 19, 2001 || Socorro || LINEAR || NYS || align=right data-sort-value="0.68" | 680 m || 
|-id=622 bgcolor=#d6d6d6
| 390622 ||  || — || December 18, 2001 || Socorro || LINEAR || TIR || align=right | 3.0 km || 
|-id=623 bgcolor=#d6d6d6
| 390623 ||  || — || January 4, 2002 || Kitt Peak || Spacewatch || — || align=right | 3.4 km || 
|-id=624 bgcolor=#d6d6d6
| 390624 ||  || — || January 5, 2002 || Palomar || NEAT || EUP || align=right | 4.5 km || 
|-id=625 bgcolor=#d6d6d6
| 390625 ||  || — || January 19, 2002 || Anderson Mesa || LONEOS || Tj (2.98) || align=right | 3.4 km || 
|-id=626 bgcolor=#d6d6d6
| 390626 ||  || — || January 19, 2002 || Socorro || LINEAR || Tj (2.95) || align=right | 3.9 km || 
|-id=627 bgcolor=#fefefe
| 390627 ||  || — || February 6, 2002 || Socorro || LINEAR || — || align=right | 1.0 km || 
|-id=628 bgcolor=#d6d6d6
| 390628 ||  || — || February 7, 2002 || Socorro || LINEAR || — || align=right | 3.6 km || 
|-id=629 bgcolor=#d6d6d6
| 390629 ||  || — || February 10, 2002 || Socorro || LINEAR || — || align=right | 3.4 km || 
|-id=630 bgcolor=#d6d6d6
| 390630 ||  || — || February 6, 2002 || Palomar || NEAT || THB || align=right | 3.3 km || 
|-id=631 bgcolor=#d6d6d6
| 390631 ||  || — || February 10, 2002 || Socorro || LINEAR || — || align=right | 2.6 km || 
|-id=632 bgcolor=#d6d6d6
| 390632 ||  || — || February 19, 2002 || Socorro || LINEAR || EUP || align=right | 5.1 km || 
|-id=633 bgcolor=#fefefe
| 390633 ||  || — || March 19, 2002 || Palomar || NEAT || LCI || align=right | 1.4 km || 
|-id=634 bgcolor=#E9E9E9
| 390634 ||  || — || April 13, 2002 || Palomar || NEAT || — || align=right data-sort-value="0.99" | 990 m || 
|-id=635 bgcolor=#E9E9E9
| 390635 ||  || — || April 14, 2002 || Socorro || LINEAR || — || align=right | 2.0 km || 
|-id=636 bgcolor=#FA8072
| 390636 ||  || — || May 4, 2002 || Socorro || LINEAR || — || align=right | 1.9 km || 
|-id=637 bgcolor=#E9E9E9
| 390637 ||  || — || May 14, 2002 || Palomar || NEAT || — || align=right | 2.4 km || 
|-id=638 bgcolor=#FA8072
| 390638 ||  || — || June 13, 2002 || Palomar || NEAT || — || align=right data-sort-value="0.59" | 590 m || 
|-id=639 bgcolor=#E9E9E9
| 390639 ||  || — || July 5, 2002 || Socorro || LINEAR || — || align=right | 2.4 km || 
|-id=640 bgcolor=#E9E9E9
| 390640 ||  || — || July 14, 2002 || Palomar || NEAT || — || align=right | 2.0 km || 
|-id=641 bgcolor=#fefefe
| 390641 ||  || — || July 13, 2002 || Palomar || NEAT || — || align=right data-sort-value="0.57" | 570 m || 
|-id=642 bgcolor=#E9E9E9
| 390642 ||  || — || July 14, 2002 || Palomar || NEAT || — || align=right | 1.2 km || 
|-id=643 bgcolor=#E9E9E9
| 390643 ||  || — || July 18, 2002 || Socorro || LINEAR || GER || align=right | 2.5 km || 
|-id=644 bgcolor=#E9E9E9
| 390644 ||  || — || July 16, 2002 || Palomar || NEAT || — || align=right | 2.7 km || 
|-id=645 bgcolor=#E9E9E9
| 390645 ||  || — || August 4, 2002 || Socorro || LINEAR || — || align=right | 2.6 km || 
|-id=646 bgcolor=#FA8072
| 390646 ||  || — || August 9, 2002 || Socorro || LINEAR || — || align=right data-sort-value="0.76" | 760 m || 
|-id=647 bgcolor=#E9E9E9
| 390647 ||  || — || August 10, 2002 || Socorro || LINEAR || — || align=right | 3.9 km || 
|-id=648 bgcolor=#E9E9E9
| 390648 ||  || — || August 12, 2002 || Anderson Mesa || LONEOS || ADE || align=right | 2.4 km || 
|-id=649 bgcolor=#E9E9E9
| 390649 ||  || — || August 12, 2002 || Socorro || LINEAR || — || align=right | 1.1 km || 
|-id=650 bgcolor=#E9E9E9
| 390650 ||  || — || August 12, 2002 || Socorro || LINEAR || JUN || align=right | 1.4 km || 
|-id=651 bgcolor=#fefefe
| 390651 ||  || — || August 8, 2002 || Palomar || NEAT || — || align=right data-sort-value="0.72" | 720 m || 
|-id=652 bgcolor=#fefefe
| 390652 ||  || — || August 28, 2002 || Palomar || NEAT || — || align=right data-sort-value="0.73" | 730 m || 
|-id=653 bgcolor=#E9E9E9
| 390653 ||  || — || August 27, 2002 || Palomar || NEAT || MAR || align=right | 1.2 km || 
|-id=654 bgcolor=#fefefe
| 390654 ||  || — || August 27, 2002 || Palomar || NEAT || critical || align=right data-sort-value="0.62" | 620 m || 
|-id=655 bgcolor=#fefefe
| 390655 ||  || — || August 29, 2002 || Palomar || Palomar Obs. || FLO || align=right data-sort-value="0.67" | 670 m || 
|-id=656 bgcolor=#E9E9E9
| 390656 ||  || — || August 16, 2002 || Palomar || NEAT || PAD || align=right | 1.8 km || 
|-id=657 bgcolor=#fefefe
| 390657 ||  || — || August 30, 2002 || Palomar || NEAT || — || align=right data-sort-value="0.75" | 750 m || 
|-id=658 bgcolor=#E9E9E9
| 390658 ||  || — || August 30, 2002 || Palomar || NEAT || — || align=right | 1.7 km || 
|-id=659 bgcolor=#E9E9E9
| 390659 ||  || — || August 30, 2002 || Palomar || NEAT || — || align=right | 1.9 km || 
|-id=660 bgcolor=#E9E9E9
| 390660 ||  || — || August 17, 2002 || Palomar || NEAT || — || align=right | 1.5 km || 
|-id=661 bgcolor=#d6d6d6
| 390661 ||  || — || September 5, 2002 || Socorro || LINEAR || — || align=right | 3.5 km || 
|-id=662 bgcolor=#FA8072
| 390662 ||  || — || September 5, 2002 || Socorro || LINEAR || — || align=right data-sort-value="0.71" | 710 m || 
|-id=663 bgcolor=#fefefe
| 390663 ||  || — || September 6, 2002 || Socorro || LINEAR || — || align=right | 1.4 km || 
|-id=664 bgcolor=#E9E9E9
| 390664 ||  || — || September 12, 2002 || Palomar || NEAT || — || align=right | 2.8 km || 
|-id=665 bgcolor=#E9E9E9
| 390665 ||  || — || September 15, 2002 || Kitt Peak || Spacewatch || — || align=right | 1.9 km || 
|-id=666 bgcolor=#E9E9E9
| 390666 ||  || — || September 11, 2002 || Palomar || M. White, M. Collins || HOF || align=right | 2.2 km || 
|-id=667 bgcolor=#E9E9E9
| 390667 ||  || — || September 13, 2002 || Palomar || NEAT || — || align=right | 2.2 km || 
|-id=668 bgcolor=#FA8072
| 390668 ||  || — || September 27, 2002 || Palomar || NEAT || H || align=right data-sort-value="0.78" | 780 m || 
|-id=669 bgcolor=#d6d6d6
| 390669 ||  || — || September 26, 2002 || Palomar || NEAT || BRA || align=right | 1.6 km || 
|-id=670 bgcolor=#E9E9E9
| 390670 ||  || — || September 30, 2002 || Socorro || LINEAR || — || align=right | 2.6 km || 
|-id=671 bgcolor=#fefefe
| 390671 ||  || — || September 16, 2002 || Palomar || NEAT || — || align=right data-sort-value="0.67" | 670 m || 
|-id=672 bgcolor=#fefefe
| 390672 ||  || — || October 2, 2002 || Socorro || LINEAR || H || align=right data-sort-value="0.62" | 620 m || 
|-id=673 bgcolor=#fefefe
| 390673 ||  || — || October 3, 2002 || Palomar || NEAT || H || align=right data-sort-value="0.87" | 870 m || 
|-id=674 bgcolor=#E9E9E9
| 390674 ||  || — || October 2, 2002 || Haleakala || NEAT || — || align=right | 3.0 km || 
|-id=675 bgcolor=#FA8072
| 390675 ||  || — || October 5, 2002 || Palomar || NEAT || H || align=right data-sort-value="0.87" | 870 m || 
|-id=676 bgcolor=#E9E9E9
| 390676 ||  || — || October 7, 2002 || Haleakala || NEAT || — || align=right | 2.0 km || 
|-id=677 bgcolor=#fefefe
| 390677 ||  || — || October 7, 2002 || Socorro || LINEAR || — || align=right data-sort-value="0.80" | 800 m || 
|-id=678 bgcolor=#E9E9E9
| 390678 ||  || — || October 9, 2002 || Socorro || LINEAR || JUN || align=right | 1.1 km || 
|-id=679 bgcolor=#fefefe
| 390679 ||  || — || October 10, 2002 || Socorro || LINEAR || H || align=right data-sort-value="0.73" | 730 m || 
|-id=680 bgcolor=#d6d6d6
| 390680 ||  || — || October 10, 2002 || Socorro || LINEAR || — || align=right | 2.7 km || 
|-id=681 bgcolor=#E9E9E9
| 390681 ||  || — || October 5, 2002 || Apache Point || SDSS || — || align=right | 1.8 km || 
|-id=682 bgcolor=#E9E9E9
| 390682 ||  || — || October 10, 2002 || Apache Point || SDSS || — || align=right | 1.7 km || 
|-id=683 bgcolor=#E9E9E9
| 390683 ||  || — || October 10, 2002 || Apache Point || SDSS || HOF || align=right | 2.7 km || 
|-id=684 bgcolor=#fefefe
| 390684 ||  || — || October 29, 2002 || Socorro || LINEAR || PHO || align=right | 1.0 km || 
|-id=685 bgcolor=#E9E9E9
| 390685 ||  || — || October 4, 2002 || Socorro || LINEAR || — || align=right | 1.8 km || 
|-id=686 bgcolor=#E9E9E9
| 390686 ||  || — || October 29, 2002 || Apache Point || SDSS || EUN || align=right | 1.7 km || 
|-id=687 bgcolor=#E9E9E9
| 390687 ||  || — || November 2, 2002 || La Palma || La Palma Obs. || — || align=right | 2.3 km || 
|-id=688 bgcolor=#E9E9E9
| 390688 ||  || — || October 4, 2002 || Socorro || LINEAR || — || align=right | 2.9 km || 
|-id=689 bgcolor=#FA8072
| 390689 ||  || — || November 12, 2002 || Socorro || LINEAR || — || align=right data-sort-value="0.50" | 500 m || 
|-id=690 bgcolor=#fefefe
| 390690 ||  || — || November 13, 2002 || Socorro || LINEAR || — || align=right data-sort-value="0.85" | 850 m || 
|-id=691 bgcolor=#fefefe
| 390691 ||  || — || December 7, 2002 || Desert Eagle || W. K. Y. Yeung || — || align=right data-sort-value="0.77" | 770 m || 
|-id=692 bgcolor=#d6d6d6
| 390692 ||  || — || December 11, 2002 || Socorro || LINEAR || — || align=right | 3.4 km || 
|-id=693 bgcolor=#fefefe
| 390693 ||  || — || December 5, 2002 || Haleakala || NEAT || H || align=right data-sort-value="0.61" | 610 m || 
|-id=694 bgcolor=#fefefe
| 390694 ||  || — || December 27, 2002 || Socorro || LINEAR || H || align=right data-sort-value="0.99" | 990 m || 
|-id=695 bgcolor=#FA8072
| 390695 ||  || — || January 3, 2003 || Socorro || LINEAR || — || align=right | 1.5 km || 
|-id=696 bgcolor=#d6d6d6
| 390696 ||  || — || January 5, 2003 || Socorro || LINEAR || — || align=right | 3.0 km || 
|-id=697 bgcolor=#fefefe
| 390697 ||  || — || January 8, 2003 || Socorro || LINEAR || — || align=right | 1.9 km || 
|-id=698 bgcolor=#fefefe
| 390698 ||  || — || January 1, 2003 || Socorro || LINEAR || FLO || align=right data-sort-value="0.91" | 910 m || 
|-id=699 bgcolor=#d6d6d6
| 390699 ||  || — || January 27, 2003 || Socorro || LINEAR || — || align=right | 2.1 km || 
|-id=700 bgcolor=#fefefe
| 390700 ||  || — || January 27, 2003 || Socorro || LINEAR || — || align=right | 1.00 km || 
|}

390701–390800 

|-bgcolor=#fefefe
| 390701 ||  || — || January 30, 2003 || Anderson Mesa || LONEOS || — || align=right data-sort-value="0.89" | 890 m || 
|-id=702 bgcolor=#d6d6d6
| 390702 ||  || — || January 5, 2003 || Kitt Peak || Spacewatch || EOS || align=right | 2.2 km || 
|-id=703 bgcolor=#d6d6d6
| 390703 ||  || — || January 28, 2003 || Kitt Peak || Spacewatch || — || align=right | 2.9 km || 
|-id=704 bgcolor=#d6d6d6
| 390704 ||  || — || February 10, 2003 || Kitt Peak || Spacewatch || — || align=right | 3.3 km || 
|-id=705 bgcolor=#fefefe
| 390705 ||  || — || February 10, 2003 || Kitt Peak || Spacewatch || NYS || align=right data-sort-value="0.60" | 600 m || 
|-id=706 bgcolor=#fefefe
| 390706 ||  || — || February 22, 2003 || Palomar || NEAT || NYS || align=right data-sort-value="0.65" | 650 m || 
|-id=707 bgcolor=#fefefe
| 390707 ||  || — || February 26, 2003 || Campo Imperatore || CINEOS || V || align=right data-sort-value="0.75" | 750 m || 
|-id=708 bgcolor=#fefefe
| 390708 ||  || — || March 6, 2003 || Socorro || LINEAR || — || align=right data-sort-value="0.83" | 830 m || 
|-id=709 bgcolor=#fefefe
| 390709 ||  || — || March 10, 2003 || Kitt Peak || Spacewatch || — || align=right data-sort-value="0.84" | 840 m || 
|-id=710 bgcolor=#d6d6d6
| 390710 ||  || — || March 24, 2003 || Kitt Peak || Spacewatch || EOS || align=right | 2.3 km || 
|-id=711 bgcolor=#d6d6d6
| 390711 ||  || — || March 24, 2003 || Kitt Peak || Spacewatch || — || align=right | 3.1 km || 
|-id=712 bgcolor=#fefefe
| 390712 ||  || — || March 24, 2003 || Kitt Peak || Spacewatch || V || align=right data-sort-value="0.70" | 700 m || 
|-id=713 bgcolor=#fefefe
| 390713 ||  || — || March 26, 2003 || Palomar || NEAT || — || align=right | 1.1 km || 
|-id=714 bgcolor=#fefefe
| 390714 ||  || — || March 26, 2003 || Kitt Peak || Spacewatch || — || align=right | 1.1 km || 
|-id=715 bgcolor=#fefefe
| 390715 ||  || — || March 27, 2003 || Palomar || NEAT || — || align=right | 1.3 km || 
|-id=716 bgcolor=#d6d6d6
| 390716 ||  || — || March 29, 2003 || Anderson Mesa || LONEOS || EUP || align=right | 2.5 km || 
|-id=717 bgcolor=#fefefe
| 390717 ||  || — || March 26, 2003 || Kitt Peak || Spacewatch || NYS || align=right data-sort-value="0.67" | 670 m || 
|-id=718 bgcolor=#fefefe
| 390718 ||  || — || March 30, 2003 || Kitt Peak || M. W. Buie || MAS || align=right data-sort-value="0.70" | 700 m || 
|-id=719 bgcolor=#fefefe
| 390719 ||  || — || April 1, 2003 || Socorro || LINEAR || — || align=right | 1.3 km || 
|-id=720 bgcolor=#d6d6d6
| 390720 ||  || — || April 1, 2003 || Socorro || LINEAR || TIR || align=right | 3.1 km || 
|-id=721 bgcolor=#fefefe
| 390721 ||  || — || April 9, 2003 || Palomar || NEAT || — || align=right | 2.7 km || 
|-id=722 bgcolor=#d6d6d6
| 390722 ||  || — || April 9, 2003 || Palomar || NEAT || — || align=right | 3.2 km || 
|-id=723 bgcolor=#fefefe
| 390723 ||  || — || March 27, 2003 || Anderson Mesa || LONEOS || FLO || align=right data-sort-value="0.74" | 740 m || 
|-id=724 bgcolor=#fefefe
| 390724 ||  || — || April 4, 2003 || Kitt Peak || Spacewatch || V || align=right data-sort-value="0.89" | 890 m || 
|-id=725 bgcolor=#FFC2E0
| 390725 ||  || — || April 21, 2003 || Socorro || LINEAR || ATEPHA || align=right data-sort-value="0.29" | 290 m || 
|-id=726 bgcolor=#fefefe
| 390726 ||  || — || April 29, 2003 || Kitt Peak || Spacewatch || — || align=right | 1.1 km || 
|-id=727 bgcolor=#d6d6d6
| 390727 ||  || — || May 3, 2003 || Kitt Peak || Spacewatch || — || align=right | 4.2 km || 
|-id=728 bgcolor=#d6d6d6
| 390728 ||  || — || April 5, 2003 || Kitt Peak || Spacewatch || — || align=right | 3.4 km || 
|-id=729 bgcolor=#d6d6d6
| 390729 ||  || — || May 5, 2003 || Haleakala || NEAT || — || align=right | 4.2 km || 
|-id=730 bgcolor=#d6d6d6
| 390730 ||  || — || May 3, 2003 || Kitt Peak || Spacewatch || — || align=right | 2.8 km || 
|-id=731 bgcolor=#d6d6d6
| 390731 ||  || — || June 23, 2003 || Socorro || LINEAR || — || align=right | 3.4 km || 
|-id=732 bgcolor=#E9E9E9
| 390732 ||  || — || July 2, 2003 || Haleakala || NEAT || — || align=right | 1.4 km || 
|-id=733 bgcolor=#FA8072
| 390733 ||  || — || July 20, 2003 || Socorro || LINEAR || — || align=right | 1.1 km || 
|-id=734 bgcolor=#E9E9E9
| 390734 ||  || — || July 23, 2003 || Palomar || NEAT || — || align=right | 1.1 km || 
|-id=735 bgcolor=#E9E9E9
| 390735 ||  || — || August 23, 2003 || Socorro || LINEAR || — || align=right | 1.5 km || 
|-id=736 bgcolor=#E9E9E9
| 390736 ||  || — || September 15, 2003 || Palomar || NEAT || — || align=right | 1.3 km || 
|-id=737 bgcolor=#E9E9E9
| 390737 ||  || — || September 15, 2003 || Palomar || NEAT || — || align=right | 1.4 km || 
|-id=738 bgcolor=#E9E9E9
| 390738 ||  || — || September 16, 2003 || Kitt Peak || Spacewatch || JUN || align=right | 1.5 km || 
|-id=739 bgcolor=#E9E9E9
| 390739 ||  || — || August 25, 2003 || Socorro || LINEAR || EUN || align=right | 1.3 km || 
|-id=740 bgcolor=#E9E9E9
| 390740 ||  || — || September 16, 2003 || Kitt Peak || Spacewatch || — || align=right | 1.5 km || 
|-id=741 bgcolor=#E9E9E9
| 390741 ||  || — || September 19, 2003 || Haleakala || NEAT || — || align=right | 1.2 km || 
|-id=742 bgcolor=#d6d6d6
| 390742 ||  || — || September 18, 2003 || Kitt Peak || Spacewatch || HIL || align=right | 6.6 km || 
|-id=743 bgcolor=#E9E9E9
| 390743 Telkesmária ||  ||  || September 20, 2003 || Piszkéstető || K. Sárneczky, B. Sipőcz || BAR || align=right | 1.4 km || 
|-id=744 bgcolor=#E9E9E9
| 390744 ||  || — || September 18, 2003 || Kitt Peak || Spacewatch || — || align=right data-sort-value="0.99" | 990 m || 
|-id=745 bgcolor=#E9E9E9
| 390745 ||  || — || September 17, 2003 || Palomar || NEAT || — || align=right | 1.1 km || 
|-id=746 bgcolor=#E9E9E9
| 390746 ||  || — || September 2, 2003 || Socorro || LINEAR || — || align=right | 1.8 km || 
|-id=747 bgcolor=#E9E9E9
| 390747 ||  || — || September 22, 2003 || Anderson Mesa || LONEOS || — || align=right | 2.9 km || 
|-id=748 bgcolor=#E9E9E9
| 390748 ||  || — || September 20, 2003 || Haleakala || NEAT || BRU || align=right | 3.3 km || 
|-id=749 bgcolor=#E9E9E9
| 390749 ||  || — || September 26, 2003 || Socorro || LINEAR || — || align=right | 2.2 km || 
|-id=750 bgcolor=#E9E9E9
| 390750 ||  || — || September 20, 2003 || Socorro || LINEAR || ADE || align=right | 3.5 km || 
|-id=751 bgcolor=#E9E9E9
| 390751 ||  || — || September 17, 2003 || Palomar || NEAT || — || align=right | 1.0 km || 
|-id=752 bgcolor=#E9E9E9
| 390752 ||  || — || September 17, 2003 || Palomar || NEAT || — || align=right data-sort-value="0.98" | 980 m || 
|-id=753 bgcolor=#E9E9E9
| 390753 ||  || — || September 30, 2003 || Socorro || LINEAR || — || align=right | 2.8 km || 
|-id=754 bgcolor=#E9E9E9
| 390754 ||  || — || September 29, 2003 || Anderson Mesa || LONEOS || — || align=right | 2.1 km || 
|-id=755 bgcolor=#E9E9E9
| 390755 ||  || — || September 17, 2003 || Palomar || NEAT || — || align=right | 2.2 km || 
|-id=756 bgcolor=#E9E9E9
| 390756 ||  || — || September 16, 2003 || Kitt Peak || Spacewatch || — || align=right | 1.5 km || 
|-id=757 bgcolor=#E9E9E9
| 390757 ||  || — || September 18, 2003 || Kitt Peak || Spacewatch || — || align=right data-sort-value="0.78" | 780 m || 
|-id=758 bgcolor=#E9E9E9
| 390758 ||  || — || September 27, 2003 || Kitt Peak || Spacewatch || — || align=right | 1.6 km || 
|-id=759 bgcolor=#E9E9E9
| 390759 ||  || — || September 26, 2003 || Apache Point || SDSS || — || align=right | 1.7 km || 
|-id=760 bgcolor=#E9E9E9
| 390760 ||  || — || September 26, 2003 || Apache Point || SDSS || — || align=right | 1.4 km || 
|-id=761 bgcolor=#d6d6d6
| 390761 ||  || — || September 17, 2003 || Kitt Peak || Spacewatch || — || align=right | 2.7 km || 
|-id=762 bgcolor=#E9E9E9
| 390762 ||  || — || September 29, 2003 || Kitt Peak || Spacewatch || WIT || align=right | 1.2 km || 
|-id=763 bgcolor=#E9E9E9
| 390763 ||  || — || October 15, 2003 || Palomar || NEAT || — || align=right | 1.4 km || 
|-id=764 bgcolor=#E9E9E9
| 390764 ||  || — || October 1, 2003 || Kitt Peak || Spacewatch || MAR || align=right data-sort-value="0.81" | 810 m || 
|-id=765 bgcolor=#E9E9E9
| 390765 ||  || — || October 1, 2003 || Kitt Peak || Spacewatch || — || align=right | 1.1 km || 
|-id=766 bgcolor=#E9E9E9
| 390766 ||  || — || September 21, 2003 || Kitt Peak || Spacewatch || — || align=right | 1.7 km || 
|-id=767 bgcolor=#E9E9E9
| 390767 ||  || — || October 18, 2003 || Palomar || NEAT || — || align=right | 2.9 km || 
|-id=768 bgcolor=#E9E9E9
| 390768 ||  || — || October 20, 2003 || Palomar || NEAT || — || align=right | 1.4 km || 
|-id=769 bgcolor=#E9E9E9
| 390769 ||  || — || October 17, 2003 || Kitt Peak || Spacewatch || — || align=right | 1.7 km || 
|-id=770 bgcolor=#E9E9E9
| 390770 ||  || — || October 21, 2003 || Kitt Peak || Spacewatch || — || align=right | 3.4 km || 
|-id=771 bgcolor=#E9E9E9
| 390771 ||  || — || October 21, 2003 || Socorro || LINEAR || — || align=right | 1.8 km || 
|-id=772 bgcolor=#E9E9E9
| 390772 ||  || — || September 28, 2003 || Anderson Mesa || LONEOS || — || align=right | 1.9 km || 
|-id=773 bgcolor=#d6d6d6
| 390773 ||  || — || October 5, 2003 || Kitt Peak || Spacewatch || — || align=right | 3.7 km || 
|-id=774 bgcolor=#FA8072
| 390774 ||  || — || October 22, 2003 || Socorro || LINEAR || — || align=right | 3.8 km || 
|-id=775 bgcolor=#E9E9E9
| 390775 ||  || — || October 23, 2003 || Kitt Peak || Spacewatch || — || align=right | 1.9 km || 
|-id=776 bgcolor=#E9E9E9
| 390776 ||  || — || October 17, 2003 || Palomar || NEAT || MAR || align=right data-sort-value="0.97" | 970 m || 
|-id=777 bgcolor=#E9E9E9
| 390777 ||  || — || October 22, 2003 || Anderson Mesa || LONEOS || — || align=right | 2.7 km || 
|-id=778 bgcolor=#E9E9E9
| 390778 ||  || — || October 24, 2003 || Socorro || LINEAR || EUN || align=right | 1.4 km || 
|-id=779 bgcolor=#E9E9E9
| 390779 ||  || — || September 28, 2003 || Socorro || LINEAR || — || align=right | 2.5 km || 
|-id=780 bgcolor=#E9E9E9
| 390780 ||  || — || November 19, 2003 || Anderson Mesa || LONEOS || — || align=right | 2.1 km || 
|-id=781 bgcolor=#E9E9E9
| 390781 ||  || — || November 21, 2003 || Socorro || LINEAR || — || align=right | 2.2 km || 
|-id=782 bgcolor=#E9E9E9
| 390782 ||  || — || November 20, 2003 || Socorro || LINEAR || — || align=right | 1.8 km || 
|-id=783 bgcolor=#E9E9E9
| 390783 ||  || — || November 21, 2003 || Socorro || LINEAR || — || align=right | 2.5 km || 
|-id=784 bgcolor=#E9E9E9
| 390784 ||  || — || November 19, 2003 || Kitt Peak || Spacewatch || — || align=right | 1.9 km || 
|-id=785 bgcolor=#E9E9E9
| 390785 ||  || — || November 23, 2003 || Kitt Peak || M. W. Buie || — || align=right | 2.2 km || 
|-id=786 bgcolor=#E9E9E9
| 390786 ||  || — || December 1, 2003 || Socorro || LINEAR || — || align=right | 2.4 km || 
|-id=787 bgcolor=#E9E9E9
| 390787 ||  || — || December 17, 2003 || Socorro || LINEAR || — || align=right | 1.9 km || 
|-id=788 bgcolor=#E9E9E9
| 390788 ||  || — || December 18, 2003 || Socorro || LINEAR || — || align=right | 2.8 km || 
|-id=789 bgcolor=#E9E9E9
| 390789 ||  || — || January 21, 2004 || Socorro || LINEAR || DOR || align=right | 2.3 km || 
|-id=790 bgcolor=#d6d6d6
| 390790 ||  || — || January 28, 2004 || Catalina || CSS || — || align=right | 3.1 km || 
|-id=791 bgcolor=#E9E9E9
| 390791 ||  || — || January 22, 2004 || Socorro || LINEAR || — || align=right | 3.3 km || 
|-id=792 bgcolor=#E9E9E9
| 390792 ||  || — || January 16, 2004 || Kitt Peak || Spacewatch || — || align=right | 2.6 km || 
|-id=793 bgcolor=#E9E9E9
| 390793 ||  || — || February 11, 2004 || Kitt Peak || Spacewatch || — || align=right | 1.7 km || 
|-id=794 bgcolor=#d6d6d6
| 390794 ||  || — || January 22, 2004 || Socorro || LINEAR || — || align=right | 3.0 km || 
|-id=795 bgcolor=#d6d6d6
| 390795 ||  || — || February 14, 2004 || Socorro || LINEAR || — || align=right | 2.5 km || 
|-id=796 bgcolor=#E9E9E9
| 390796 ||  || — || February 16, 2004 || Kitt Peak || Spacewatch || MRX || align=right | 1.3 km || 
|-id=797 bgcolor=#d6d6d6
| 390797 ||  || — || March 15, 2004 || Kitt Peak || Spacewatch || KOR || align=right | 1.2 km || 
|-id=798 bgcolor=#fefefe
| 390798 ||  || — || March 16, 2004 || Kitt Peak || Spacewatch || — || align=right data-sort-value="0.63" | 630 m || 
|-id=799 bgcolor=#d6d6d6
| 390799 ||  || — || February 17, 2004 || Kitt Peak || Spacewatch || — || align=right | 2.4 km || 
|-id=800 bgcolor=#d6d6d6
| 390800 ||  || — || March 19, 2004 || Socorro || LINEAR || — || align=right | 2.2 km || 
|}

390801–390900 

|-bgcolor=#d6d6d6
| 390801 ||  || — || March 15, 2004 || Kitt Peak || Spacewatch || — || align=right | 2.4 km || 
|-id=802 bgcolor=#FA8072
| 390802 ||  || — || April 15, 2004 || Socorro || LINEAR || — || align=right | 1.4 km || 
|-id=803 bgcolor=#fefefe
| 390803 ||  || — || April 12, 2004 || Palomar || NEAT || PHO || align=right | 1.2 km || 
|-id=804 bgcolor=#fefefe
| 390804 ||  || — || April 14, 2004 || Kitt Peak || Spacewatch || — || align=right data-sort-value="0.75" | 750 m || 
|-id=805 bgcolor=#d6d6d6
| 390805 ||  || — || March 31, 2004 || Kitt Peak || Spacewatch || — || align=right | 2.3 km || 
|-id=806 bgcolor=#fefefe
| 390806 ||  || — || April 21, 2004 || Catalina || CSS || — || align=right data-sort-value="0.67" | 670 m || 
|-id=807 bgcolor=#fefefe
| 390807 ||  || — || April 22, 2004 || Socorro || LINEAR || — || align=right data-sort-value="0.90" | 900 m || 
|-id=808 bgcolor=#FA8072
| 390808 ||  || — || April 24, 2004 || Socorro || LINEAR || — || align=right data-sort-value="0.49" | 490 m || 
|-id=809 bgcolor=#fefefe
| 390809 ||  || — || March 31, 2004 || Kitt Peak || Spacewatch || — || align=right data-sort-value="0.65" | 650 m || 
|-id=810 bgcolor=#fefefe
| 390810 ||  || — || April 21, 2004 || Kitt Peak || Spacewatch || — || align=right data-sort-value="0.72" | 720 m || 
|-id=811 bgcolor=#d6d6d6
| 390811 ||  || — || April 23, 2004 || Kitt Peak || Spacewatch || — || align=right | 2.4 km || 
|-id=812 bgcolor=#FA8072
| 390812 ||  || — || May 10, 2004 || Haleakala || NEAT || — || align=right | 3.6 km || 
|-id=813 bgcolor=#fefefe
| 390813 Debwatson ||  ||  || May 13, 2004 || Hunters Hill || D. Higgins || H || align=right data-sort-value="0.96" | 960 m || 
|-id=814 bgcolor=#fefefe
| 390814 ||  || — || May 11, 2004 || Anderson Mesa || LONEOS || FLO || align=right data-sort-value="0.78" | 780 m || 
|-id=815 bgcolor=#d6d6d6
| 390815 ||  || — || May 9, 2004 || Kitt Peak || Spacewatch || — || align=right | 4.0 km || 
|-id=816 bgcolor=#fefefe
| 390816 ||  || — || May 18, 2004 || Socorro || LINEAR || FLO || align=right data-sort-value="0.63" | 630 m || 
|-id=817 bgcolor=#d6d6d6
| 390817 ||  || — || May 22, 2004 || Apache Point || SDSS || — || align=right | 2.9 km || 
|-id=818 bgcolor=#d6d6d6
| 390818 ||  || — || May 22, 2004 || Apache Point || SDSS || — || align=right | 3.1 km || 
|-id=819 bgcolor=#FA8072
| 390819 ||  || — || June 11, 2004 || Siding Spring || SSS || — || align=right data-sort-value="0.69" | 690 m || 
|-id=820 bgcolor=#d6d6d6
| 390820 ||  || — || June 14, 2004 || Siding Spring || SSS || EUP || align=right | 4.8 km || 
|-id=821 bgcolor=#fefefe
| 390821 ||  || — || June 22, 2004 || Reedy Creek || J. Broughton || — || align=right data-sort-value="0.96" | 960 m || 
|-id=822 bgcolor=#fefefe
| 390822 ||  || — || July 11, 2004 || Socorro || LINEAR || — || align=right | 1.0 km || 
|-id=823 bgcolor=#fefefe
| 390823 ||  || — || July 14, 2004 || Socorro || LINEAR || — || align=right | 1.1 km || 
|-id=824 bgcolor=#fefefe
| 390824 || 2004 OT || — || July 17, 2004 || 7300 Observatory || W. K. Y. Yeung || — || align=right data-sort-value="0.84" | 840 m || 
|-id=825 bgcolor=#fefefe
| 390825 ||  || — || July 16, 2004 || Socorro || LINEAR || — || align=right | 1.2 km || 
|-id=826 bgcolor=#d6d6d6
| 390826 ||  || — || July 22, 2004 || Anderson Mesa || LONEOS || — || align=right | 4.9 km || 
|-id=827 bgcolor=#fefefe
| 390827 ||  || — || June 27, 2004 || Catalina || CSS || PHO || align=right | 1.4 km || 
|-id=828 bgcolor=#fefefe
| 390828 ||  || — || August 8, 2004 || Socorro || LINEAR || MAS || align=right data-sort-value="0.84" | 840 m || 
|-id=829 bgcolor=#fefefe
| 390829 ||  || — || August 6, 2004 || Palomar || NEAT || — || align=right data-sort-value="0.88" | 880 m || 
|-id=830 bgcolor=#fefefe
| 390830 ||  || — || August 8, 2004 || Anderson Mesa || LONEOS || — || align=right | 1.1 km || 
|-id=831 bgcolor=#d6d6d6
| 390831 ||  || — || August 7, 2004 || Palomar || NEAT || — || align=right | 3.1 km || 
|-id=832 bgcolor=#d6d6d6
| 390832 ||  || — || August 10, 2004 || Socorro || LINEAR || — || align=right | 2.6 km || 
|-id=833 bgcolor=#d6d6d6
| 390833 ||  || — || August 11, 2004 || Socorro || LINEAR || — || align=right | 4.0 km || 
|-id=834 bgcolor=#fefefe
| 390834 ||  || — || August 10, 2004 || Socorro || LINEAR || V || align=right data-sort-value="0.62" | 620 m || 
|-id=835 bgcolor=#d6d6d6
| 390835 ||  || — || August 12, 2004 || Socorro || LINEAR || — || align=right | 3.5 km || 
|-id=836 bgcolor=#fefefe
| 390836 ||  || — || August 14, 2004 || Cerro Tololo || M. W. Buie || — || align=right data-sort-value="0.74" | 740 m || 
|-id=837 bgcolor=#fefefe
| 390837 ||  || — || August 21, 2004 || Catalina || CSS || — || align=right | 1.2 km || 
|-id=838 bgcolor=#d6d6d6
| 390838 ||  || — || August 21, 2004 || Siding Spring || SSS || — || align=right | 3.7 km || 
|-id=839 bgcolor=#fefefe
| 390839 ||  || — || September 6, 2004 || Goodricke-Pigott || Goodricke-Pigott Obs. || — || align=right | 1.2 km || 
|-id=840 bgcolor=#fefefe
| 390840 ||  || — || September 7, 2004 || Kitt Peak || Spacewatch || V || align=right data-sort-value="0.75" | 750 m || 
|-id=841 bgcolor=#d6d6d6
| 390841 ||  || — || September 8, 2004 || Socorro || LINEAR || — || align=right | 2.9 km || 
|-id=842 bgcolor=#fefefe
| 390842 ||  || — || September 8, 2004 || Socorro || LINEAR || — || align=right data-sort-value="0.94" | 940 m || 
|-id=843 bgcolor=#fefefe
| 390843 ||  || — || September 8, 2004 || Socorro || LINEAR || NYS || align=right data-sort-value="0.63" | 630 m || 
|-id=844 bgcolor=#fefefe
| 390844 ||  || — || September 7, 2004 || Palomar || NEAT || — || align=right | 1.2 km || 
|-id=845 bgcolor=#fefefe
| 390845 ||  || — || September 7, 2004 || Kitt Peak || Spacewatch || — || align=right data-sort-value="0.67" | 670 m || 
|-id=846 bgcolor=#d6d6d6
| 390846 ||  || — || September 8, 2004 || Palomar || NEAT || — || align=right | 2.6 km || 
|-id=847 bgcolor=#d6d6d6
| 390847 ||  || — || September 11, 2004 || Socorro || LINEAR || TIR || align=right | 2.6 km || 
|-id=848 bgcolor=#fefefe
| 390848 Veerle ||  ||  || September 8, 2004 || Uccle || T. Pauwels, P. De Cat || V || align=right data-sort-value="0.71" | 710 m || 
|-id=849 bgcolor=#fefefe
| 390849 ||  || — || September 10, 2004 || Socorro || LINEAR || V || align=right data-sort-value="0.83" | 830 m || 
|-id=850 bgcolor=#fefefe
| 390850 ||  || — || September 10, 2004 || Socorro || LINEAR || — || align=right data-sort-value="0.98" | 980 m || 
|-id=851 bgcolor=#fefefe
| 390851 ||  || — || September 10, 2004 || Socorro || LINEAR || — || align=right data-sort-value="0.90" | 900 m || 
|-id=852 bgcolor=#fefefe
| 390852 ||  || — || September 10, 2004 || Socorro || LINEAR || — || align=right data-sort-value="0.94" | 940 m || 
|-id=853 bgcolor=#d6d6d6
| 390853 ||  || — || September 10, 2004 || Socorro || LINEAR || — || align=right | 3.8 km || 
|-id=854 bgcolor=#d6d6d6
| 390854 ||  || — || September 11, 2004 || Socorro || LINEAR || — || align=right | 5.8 km || 
|-id=855 bgcolor=#E9E9E9
| 390855 ||  || — || September 11, 2004 || Socorro || LINEAR || — || align=right | 1.4 km || 
|-id=856 bgcolor=#d6d6d6
| 390856 ||  || — || September 11, 2004 || Socorro || LINEAR || EUP || align=right | 3.8 km || 
|-id=857 bgcolor=#d6d6d6
| 390857 ||  || — || September 10, 2004 || Kitt Peak || Spacewatch || THM || align=right | 3.3 km || 
|-id=858 bgcolor=#fefefe
| 390858 ||  || — || September 10, 2004 || Kitt Peak || Spacewatch || — || align=right data-sort-value="0.94" | 940 m || 
|-id=859 bgcolor=#d6d6d6
| 390859 ||  || — || September 13, 2004 || Kitt Peak || Spacewatch || — || align=right | 3.2 km || 
|-id=860 bgcolor=#fefefe
| 390860 ||  || — || September 13, 2004 || Kitt Peak || Spacewatch || V || align=right data-sort-value="0.68" | 680 m || 
|-id=861 bgcolor=#d6d6d6
| 390861 ||  || — || September 13, 2004 || Kitt Peak || Spacewatch || 7:4 || align=right | 3.6 km || 
|-id=862 bgcolor=#fefefe
| 390862 ||  || — || September 17, 2004 || Kitt Peak || Spacewatch || — || align=right data-sort-value="0.70" | 700 m || 
|-id=863 bgcolor=#fefefe
| 390863 ||  || — || September 17, 2004 || Kitt Peak || Spacewatch || — || align=right data-sort-value="0.76" | 760 m || 
|-id=864 bgcolor=#fefefe
| 390864 ||  || — || October 4, 2004 || Kitt Peak || Spacewatch || — || align=right data-sort-value="0.75" | 750 m || 
|-id=865 bgcolor=#fefefe
| 390865 ||  || — || October 4, 2004 || Kitt Peak || Spacewatch || — || align=right data-sort-value="0.88" | 880 m || 
|-id=866 bgcolor=#E9E9E9
| 390866 ||  || — || October 6, 2004 || Palomar || NEAT || — || align=right | 1.1 km || 
|-id=867 bgcolor=#fefefe
| 390867 ||  || — || October 5, 2004 || Kitt Peak || Spacewatch || LCI || align=right | 1.2 km || 
|-id=868 bgcolor=#d6d6d6
| 390868 ||  || — || October 7, 2004 || Socorro || LINEAR || — || align=right | 3.2 km || 
|-id=869 bgcolor=#fefefe
| 390869 ||  || — || October 5, 2004 || Anderson Mesa || LONEOS || V || align=right data-sort-value="0.93" | 930 m || 
|-id=870 bgcolor=#fefefe
| 390870 ||  || — || October 7, 2004 || Socorro || LINEAR || — || align=right data-sort-value="0.93" | 930 m || 
|-id=871 bgcolor=#fefefe
| 390871 ||  || — || October 7, 2004 || Socorro || LINEAR || — || align=right | 1.1 km || 
|-id=872 bgcolor=#FA8072
| 390872 ||  || — || August 13, 2004 || Socorro || LINEAR || — || align=right data-sort-value="0.79" | 790 m || 
|-id=873 bgcolor=#E9E9E9
| 390873 ||  || — || October 6, 2004 || Kitt Peak || Spacewatch || — || align=right data-sort-value="0.78" | 780 m || 
|-id=874 bgcolor=#E9E9E9
| 390874 ||  || — || October 7, 2004 || Socorro || LINEAR || — || align=right | 2.4 km || 
|-id=875 bgcolor=#fefefe
| 390875 ||  || — || October 7, 2004 || Kitt Peak || Spacewatch || V || align=right data-sort-value="0.88" | 880 m || 
|-id=876 bgcolor=#fefefe
| 390876 ||  || — || September 22, 2004 || Desert Eagle || W. K. Y. Yeung || — || align=right data-sort-value="0.90" | 900 m || 
|-id=877 bgcolor=#fefefe
| 390877 ||  || — || October 13, 2004 || Moletai || K. Černis, J. Zdanavičius || — || align=right data-sort-value="0.98" | 980 m || 
|-id=878 bgcolor=#E9E9E9
| 390878 ||  || — || October 9, 2004 || Kitt Peak || Spacewatch || MRX || align=right data-sort-value="0.99" | 990 m || 
|-id=879 bgcolor=#fefefe
| 390879 ||  || — || October 9, 2004 || Socorro || LINEAR || H || align=right | 1.0 km || 
|-id=880 bgcolor=#fefefe
| 390880 ||  || — || October 10, 2004 || Kitt Peak || Spacewatch || — || align=right | 2.3 km || 
|-id=881 bgcolor=#fefefe
| 390881 ||  || — || October 9, 2004 || Kitt Peak || Spacewatch || V || align=right data-sort-value="0.85" | 850 m || 
|-id=882 bgcolor=#fefefe
| 390882 ||  || — || November 7, 2004 || Socorro || LINEAR || MAS || align=right data-sort-value="0.75" | 750 m || 
|-id=883 bgcolor=#E9E9E9
| 390883 ||  || — || November 9, 2004 || Catalina || CSS || — || align=right data-sort-value="0.75" | 750 m || 
|-id=884 bgcolor=#fefefe
| 390884 ||  || — || November 11, 2004 || Kitt Peak || Kitt Peak Obs. || — || align=right | 1.1 km || 
|-id=885 bgcolor=#E9E9E9
| 390885 ||  || — || December 3, 2004 || Kitt Peak || Spacewatch || — || align=right data-sort-value="0.91" | 910 m || 
|-id=886 bgcolor=#E9E9E9
| 390886 ||  || — || December 11, 2004 || Kitt Peak || Spacewatch || — || align=right | 1.3 km || 
|-id=887 bgcolor=#fefefe
| 390887 ||  || — || November 20, 2004 || Kitt Peak || Spacewatch || — || align=right | 1.2 km || 
|-id=888 bgcolor=#E9E9E9
| 390888 ||  || — || December 12, 2004 || Kitt Peak || Spacewatch || JUN || align=right | 1.3 km || 
|-id=889 bgcolor=#E9E9E9
| 390889 ||  || — || December 14, 2004 || Catalina || CSS || — || align=right | 1.0 km || 
|-id=890 bgcolor=#E9E9E9
| 390890 ||  || — || December 2, 2004 || Kitt Peak || Spacewatch || — || align=right | 1.2 km || 
|-id=891 bgcolor=#E9E9E9
| 390891 ||  || — || December 18, 2004 || Mount Lemmon || Mount Lemmon Survey || — || align=right | 1.3 km || 
|-id=892 bgcolor=#E9E9E9
| 390892 ||  || — || December 17, 2004 || Socorro || LINEAR || — || align=right | 1.3 km || 
|-id=893 bgcolor=#E9E9E9
| 390893 ||  || — || January 13, 2005 || Catalina || CSS || — || align=right | 2.4 km || 
|-id=894 bgcolor=#E9E9E9
| 390894 ||  || — || January 13, 2005 || Socorro || LINEAR || JUN || align=right | 2.6 km || 
|-id=895 bgcolor=#E9E9E9
| 390895 ||  || — || January 15, 2005 || Kitt Peak || Spacewatch || — || align=right | 1.0 km || 
|-id=896 bgcolor=#E9E9E9
| 390896 ||  || — || January 6, 2005 || Socorro || LINEAR || EUN || align=right | 1.6 km || 
|-id=897 bgcolor=#E9E9E9
| 390897 ||  || — || January 17, 2005 || Socorro || LINEAR || — || align=right | 2.6 km || 
|-id=898 bgcolor=#E9E9E9
| 390898 ||  || — || February 1, 2005 || Kitt Peak || Spacewatch || — || align=right | 1.5 km || 
|-id=899 bgcolor=#E9E9E9
| 390899 ||  || — || February 3, 2005 || Socorro || LINEAR || — || align=right | 2.0 km || 
|-id=900 bgcolor=#E9E9E9
| 390900 ||  || — || March 2, 2005 || Calvin-Rehoboth || Calvin–Rehoboth Obs. || JUN || align=right data-sort-value="0.94" | 940 m || 
|}

390901–391000 

|-bgcolor=#E9E9E9
| 390901 ||  || — || March 1, 2005 || Kitt Peak || Spacewatch || — || align=right | 2.5 km || 
|-id=902 bgcolor=#E9E9E9
| 390902 ||  || — || March 4, 2005 || Kitt Peak || Spacewatch || — || align=right | 1.8 km || 
|-id=903 bgcolor=#E9E9E9
| 390903 ||  || — || March 4, 2005 || Mount Lemmon || Mount Lemmon Survey || — || align=right | 2.4 km || 
|-id=904 bgcolor=#E9E9E9
| 390904 ||  || — || March 3, 2005 || Kitt Peak || Spacewatch || — || align=right | 2.1 km || 
|-id=905 bgcolor=#E9E9E9
| 390905 ||  || — || March 4, 2005 || Catalina || CSS || — || align=right | 3.1 km || 
|-id=906 bgcolor=#E9E9E9
| 390906 ||  || — || March 8, 2005 || Anderson Mesa || LONEOS || — || align=right | 2.2 km || 
|-id=907 bgcolor=#E9E9E9
| 390907 ||  || — || March 10, 2005 || Mayhill || A. Lowe || EUN || align=right | 1.4 km || 
|-id=908 bgcolor=#E9E9E9
| 390908 ||  || — || March 3, 2005 || Catalina || CSS || — || align=right | 2.4 km || 
|-id=909 bgcolor=#E9E9E9
| 390909 ||  || — || March 3, 2005 || Catalina || CSS || JUN || align=right | 1.7 km || 
|-id=910 bgcolor=#E9E9E9
| 390910 ||  || — || March 4, 2005 || Mount Lemmon || Mount Lemmon Survey || — || align=right | 2.1 km || 
|-id=911 bgcolor=#E9E9E9
| 390911 ||  || — || March 4, 2005 || Mount Lemmon || Mount Lemmon Survey || — || align=right | 1.7 km || 
|-id=912 bgcolor=#E9E9E9
| 390912 ||  || — || March 7, 2005 || Socorro || LINEAR || — || align=right | 2.5 km || 
|-id=913 bgcolor=#E9E9E9
| 390913 ||  || — || March 1, 2005 || Kitt Peak || Spacewatch || — || align=right | 2.2 km || 
|-id=914 bgcolor=#E9E9E9
| 390914 ||  || — || February 2, 2005 || Socorro || LINEAR || — || align=right | 2.6 km || 
|-id=915 bgcolor=#E9E9E9
| 390915 ||  || — || March 9, 2005 || Kitt Peak || Spacewatch || — || align=right | 1.9 km || 
|-id=916 bgcolor=#E9E9E9
| 390916 ||  || — || March 10, 2005 || Mount Lemmon || Mount Lemmon Survey || — || align=right | 2.6 km || 
|-id=917 bgcolor=#E9E9E9
| 390917 ||  || — || March 11, 2005 || Mount Lemmon || Mount Lemmon Survey || GEF || align=right | 1.1 km || 
|-id=918 bgcolor=#fefefe
| 390918 ||  || — || March 10, 2005 || Mount Lemmon || Mount Lemmon Survey || — || align=right data-sort-value="0.77" | 770 m || 
|-id=919 bgcolor=#E9E9E9
| 390919 ||  || — || March 11, 2005 || Kitt Peak || Spacewatch || — || align=right | 2.8 km || 
|-id=920 bgcolor=#E9E9E9
| 390920 ||  || — || March 10, 2005 || Mount Lemmon || Mount Lemmon Survey || AEO || align=right | 1.0 km || 
|-id=921 bgcolor=#E9E9E9
| 390921 ||  || — || March 11, 2005 || Catalina || CSS || — || align=right | 1.7 km || 
|-id=922 bgcolor=#E9E9E9
| 390922 ||  || — || March 11, 2005 || Anderson Mesa || LONEOS || — || align=right | 2.1 km || 
|-id=923 bgcolor=#E9E9E9
| 390923 ||  || — || March 12, 2005 || Socorro || LINEAR || — || align=right | 2.7 km || 
|-id=924 bgcolor=#E9E9E9
| 390924 ||  || — || March 11, 2005 || Mount Lemmon || Mount Lemmon Survey || — || align=right | 1.7 km || 
|-id=925 bgcolor=#E9E9E9
| 390925 ||  || — || October 30, 2002 || Kitt Peak || Spacewatch || — || align=right | 1.5 km || 
|-id=926 bgcolor=#E9E9E9
| 390926 ||  || — || March 11, 2005 || Catalina || CSS || — || align=right | 1.6 km || 
|-id=927 bgcolor=#FA8072
| 390927 ||  || — || March 17, 2005 || Kitt Peak || Spacewatch || — || align=right | 2.0 km || 
|-id=928 bgcolor=#E9E9E9
| 390928 ||  || — || April 1, 2005 || Kitt Peak || Spacewatch || MRX || align=right | 1.2 km || 
|-id=929 bgcolor=#FFC2E0
| 390929 ||  || — || April 4, 2005 || Mount Lemmon || Mount Lemmon Survey || APOPHA || align=right data-sort-value="0.29" | 290 m || 
|-id=930 bgcolor=#E9E9E9
| 390930 ||  || — || April 2, 2005 || Kitt Peak || Spacewatch || — || align=right | 2.1 km || 
|-id=931 bgcolor=#E9E9E9
| 390931 ||  || — || April 2, 2005 || Mount Lemmon || Mount Lemmon Survey || — || align=right | 2.1 km || 
|-id=932 bgcolor=#E9E9E9
| 390932 ||  || — || April 3, 2005 || Socorro || LINEAR || — || align=right | 2.2 km || 
|-id=933 bgcolor=#E9E9E9
| 390933 ||  || — || April 5, 2005 || Mount Lemmon || Mount Lemmon Survey || NEM || align=right | 2.3 km || 
|-id=934 bgcolor=#E9E9E9
| 390934 ||  || — || April 2, 2005 || Mount Lemmon || Mount Lemmon Survey || — || align=right | 2.4 km || 
|-id=935 bgcolor=#E9E9E9
| 390935 ||  || — || April 4, 2005 || Catalina || CSS || 526 || align=right | 3.4 km || 
|-id=936 bgcolor=#E9E9E9
| 390936 ||  || — || April 9, 2005 || Catalina || CSS || TIN || align=right | 2.4 km || 
|-id=937 bgcolor=#E9E9E9
| 390937 ||  || — || April 10, 2005 || Mount Lemmon || Mount Lemmon Survey || — || align=right | 2.3 km || 
|-id=938 bgcolor=#d6d6d6
| 390938 ||  || — || April 11, 2005 || Mount Lemmon || Mount Lemmon Survey || — || align=right | 2.5 km || 
|-id=939 bgcolor=#E9E9E9
| 390939 ||  || — || April 11, 2005 || Kitt Peak || Spacewatch || — || align=right | 1.7 km || 
|-id=940 bgcolor=#E9E9E9
| 390940 ||  || — || April 12, 2005 || Socorro || LINEAR || JUN || align=right | 2.5 km || 
|-id=941 bgcolor=#E9E9E9
| 390941 ||  || — || April 7, 2005 || Kitt Peak || Spacewatch || GEF || align=right | 1.6 km || 
|-id=942 bgcolor=#E9E9E9
| 390942 ||  || — || April 6, 2005 || Catalina || CSS || — || align=right | 3.2 km || 
|-id=943 bgcolor=#E9E9E9
| 390943 ||  || — || November 24, 2003 || Kitt Peak || Spacewatch || — || align=right | 1.9 km || 
|-id=944 bgcolor=#d6d6d6
| 390944 ||  || — || May 3, 2005 || Kitt Peak || Spacewatch || CHA || align=right | 1.9 km || 
|-id=945 bgcolor=#E9E9E9
| 390945 ||  || — || May 4, 2005 || Kitt Peak || Spacewatch || — || align=right | 2.4 km || 
|-id=946 bgcolor=#E9E9E9
| 390946 ||  || — || May 14, 2005 || Kitt Peak || Spacewatch || — || align=right | 2.1 km || 
|-id=947 bgcolor=#E9E9E9
| 390947 ||  || — || May 13, 2005 || Kitt Peak || Spacewatch || — || align=right | 2.8 km || 
|-id=948 bgcolor=#E9E9E9
| 390948 ||  || — || May 13, 2005 || Kitt Peak || Spacewatch || — || align=right | 3.2 km || 
|-id=949 bgcolor=#E9E9E9
| 390949 ||  || — || April 6, 2005 || Mount Lemmon || Mount Lemmon Survey || — || align=right | 2.5 km || 
|-id=950 bgcolor=#E9E9E9
| 390950 ||  || — || June 1, 2005 || Mount Lemmon || Mount Lemmon Survey || — || align=right | 1.7 km || 
|-id=951 bgcolor=#E9E9E9
| 390951 ||  || — || June 10, 2005 || Kitt Peak || Spacewatch || AGN || align=right | 1.4 km || 
|-id=952 bgcolor=#E9E9E9
| 390952 ||  || — || June 6, 2005 || Kitt Peak || Spacewatch || — || align=right | 2.6 km || 
|-id=953 bgcolor=#d6d6d6
| 390953 ||  || — || September 10, 2000 || Anderson Mesa || LONEOS || — || align=right | 3.7 km || 
|-id=954 bgcolor=#d6d6d6
| 390954 ||  || — || June 13, 2005 || Kitt Peak || Spacewatch || — || align=right | 3.1 km || 
|-id=955 bgcolor=#fefefe
| 390955 ||  || — || June 30, 2005 || Kitt Peak || Spacewatch || critical || align=right data-sort-value="0.62" | 620 m || 
|-id=956 bgcolor=#d6d6d6
| 390956 ||  || — || July 4, 2005 || Mount Lemmon || Mount Lemmon Survey || — || align=right | 2.7 km || 
|-id=957 bgcolor=#d6d6d6
| 390957 ||  || — || July 5, 2005 || Palomar || NEAT || — || align=right | 3.4 km || 
|-id=958 bgcolor=#fefefe
| 390958 ||  || — || July 11, 2005 || Kitt Peak || Spacewatch || — || align=right data-sort-value="0.70" | 700 m || 
|-id=959 bgcolor=#fefefe
| 390959 ||  || — || July 28, 2005 || Palomar || NEAT || NYS || align=right data-sort-value="0.64" | 640 m || 
|-id=960 bgcolor=#d6d6d6
| 390960 ||  || — || July 30, 2005 || Palomar || NEAT || — || align=right | 3.6 km || 
|-id=961 bgcolor=#d6d6d6
| 390961 ||  || — || July 30, 2005 || Palomar || NEAT || EOS || align=right | 1.8 km || 
|-id=962 bgcolor=#d6d6d6
| 390962 ||  || — || July 5, 2005 || Mount Lemmon || Mount Lemmon Survey || HYG || align=right | 2.6 km || 
|-id=963 bgcolor=#fefefe
| 390963 ||  || — || August 22, 2005 || Palomar || NEAT || — || align=right data-sort-value="0.69" | 690 m || 
|-id=964 bgcolor=#d6d6d6
| 390964 ||  || — || August 27, 2005 || Kitt Peak || Spacewatch || — || align=right | 3.2 km || 
|-id=965 bgcolor=#d6d6d6
| 390965 ||  || — || August 26, 2005 || Palomar || NEAT || — || align=right | 3.2 km || 
|-id=966 bgcolor=#fefefe
| 390966 ||  || — || August 26, 2005 || Anderson Mesa || LONEOS || — || align=right data-sort-value="0.73" | 730 m || 
|-id=967 bgcolor=#d6d6d6
| 390967 ||  || — || August 24, 2005 || Palomar || NEAT || — || align=right | 3.4 km || 
|-id=968 bgcolor=#fefefe
| 390968 ||  || — || August 28, 2005 || Kitt Peak || Spacewatch || — || align=right data-sort-value="0.80" | 800 m || 
|-id=969 bgcolor=#d6d6d6
| 390969 ||  || — || August 28, 2005 || Kitt Peak || Spacewatch || — || align=right | 2.9 km || 
|-id=970 bgcolor=#d6d6d6
| 390970 ||  || — || August 28, 2005 || Kitt Peak || Spacewatch || — || align=right | 4.2 km || 
|-id=971 bgcolor=#d6d6d6
| 390971 ||  || — || August 28, 2005 || Kitt Peak || Spacewatch || VER || align=right | 4.7 km || 
|-id=972 bgcolor=#d6d6d6
| 390972 ||  || — || August 28, 2005 || Kitt Peak || Spacewatch || HYG || align=right | 3.0 km || 
|-id=973 bgcolor=#fefefe
| 390973 ||  || — || August 29, 2005 || Palomar || NEAT || — || align=right | 1.1 km || 
|-id=974 bgcolor=#fefefe
| 390974 ||  || — || August 28, 2005 || Kitt Peak || Spacewatch || FLO || align=right data-sort-value="0.67" | 670 m || 
|-id=975 bgcolor=#FA8072
| 390975 ||  || — || August 31, 2005 || Anderson Mesa || LONEOS || H || align=right data-sort-value="0.63" | 630 m || 
|-id=976 bgcolor=#d6d6d6
| 390976 ||  || — || August 27, 2005 || Anderson Mesa || LONEOS || TIR || align=right | 3.7 km || 
|-id=977 bgcolor=#fefefe
| 390977 ||  || — || September 11, 2005 || Kitt Peak || Spacewatch || — || align=right data-sort-value="0.79" | 790 m || 
|-id=978 bgcolor=#fefefe
| 390978 ||  || — || September 14, 2005 || Catalina || CSS || — || align=right | 1.3 km || 
|-id=979 bgcolor=#fefefe
| 390979 ||  || — || September 23, 2005 || Kitt Peak || Spacewatch || — || align=right data-sort-value="0.91" | 910 m || 
|-id=980 bgcolor=#d6d6d6
| 390980 ||  || — || September 25, 2005 || Catalina || CSS || — || align=right | 3.4 km || 
|-id=981 bgcolor=#fefefe
| 390981 ||  || — || September 23, 2005 || Kitt Peak || Spacewatch || V || align=right data-sort-value="0.71" | 710 m || 
|-id=982 bgcolor=#fefefe
| 390982 ||  || — || September 25, 2005 || Kingsnake || J. V. McClusky || FLO || align=right data-sort-value="0.87" | 870 m || 
|-id=983 bgcolor=#d6d6d6
| 390983 ||  || — || September 25, 2005 || Kitt Peak || Spacewatch || TIR || align=right | 3.3 km || 
|-id=984 bgcolor=#d6d6d6
| 390984 ||  || — || August 29, 2005 || Kitt Peak || Spacewatch || EUP || align=right | 3.9 km || 
|-id=985 bgcolor=#fefefe
| 390985 ||  || — || September 23, 2005 || Kitt Peak || Spacewatch || FLO || align=right data-sort-value="0.64" | 640 m || 
|-id=986 bgcolor=#d6d6d6
| 390986 ||  || — || September 24, 2005 || Kitt Peak || Spacewatch || THM || align=right | 2.8 km || 
|-id=987 bgcolor=#fefefe
| 390987 ||  || — || September 24, 2005 || Kitt Peak || Spacewatch || — || align=right data-sort-value="0.98" | 980 m || 
|-id=988 bgcolor=#d6d6d6
| 390988 ||  || — || September 24, 2005 || Kitt Peak || Spacewatch || — || align=right | 3.3 km || 
|-id=989 bgcolor=#d6d6d6
| 390989 ||  || — || September 26, 2005 || Kitt Peak || Spacewatch || ELF || align=right | 3.9 km || 
|-id=990 bgcolor=#d6d6d6
| 390990 ||  || — || September 27, 2005 || Kitt Peak || Spacewatch || — || align=right | 3.4 km || 
|-id=991 bgcolor=#d6d6d6
| 390991 ||  || — || September 24, 2005 || Kitt Peak || Spacewatch || — || align=right | 2.8 km || 
|-id=992 bgcolor=#d6d6d6
| 390992 ||  || — || September 24, 2005 || Kitt Peak || Spacewatch || — || align=right | 3.6 km || 
|-id=993 bgcolor=#fefefe
| 390993 ||  || — || September 24, 2005 || Kitt Peak || Spacewatch || — || align=right data-sort-value="0.78" | 780 m || 
|-id=994 bgcolor=#d6d6d6
| 390994 ||  || — || September 24, 2005 || Kitt Peak || Spacewatch || — || align=right | 3.2 km || 
|-id=995 bgcolor=#fefefe
| 390995 ||  || — || September 24, 2005 || Kitt Peak || Spacewatch || — || align=right data-sort-value="0.90" | 900 m || 
|-id=996 bgcolor=#d6d6d6
| 390996 ||  || — || September 24, 2005 || Kitt Peak || Spacewatch || — || align=right | 2.6 km || 
|-id=997 bgcolor=#d6d6d6
| 390997 ||  || — || September 24, 2005 || Kitt Peak || Spacewatch || — || align=right | 4.5 km || 
|-id=998 bgcolor=#d6d6d6
| 390998 ||  || — || September 25, 2005 || Kitt Peak || Spacewatch || EOS || align=right | 2.1 km || 
|-id=999 bgcolor=#fefefe
| 390999 ||  || — || September 25, 2005 || Kitt Peak || Spacewatch || — || align=right data-sort-value="0.97" | 970 m || 
|-id=000 bgcolor=#FA8072
| 391000 ||  || — || September 25, 2005 || Kitt Peak || Spacewatch || PHO || align=right | 1.1 km || 
|}

References

External links 
 Discovery Circumstances: Numbered Minor Planets (390001)–(395000) (IAU Minor Planet Center)

0390